= Committee of United Belgians and Liégeois =

Political committee in Revolutionary France

- Founded: 20 January 1792
- Preceded by: Vonckists; Members of the Liège Revolution
- Ideology: Belgian nationalism Liberalism; Republicanism; Francophilia
- Political position: Left-wing (Note: Left-wing by contemporary standards)

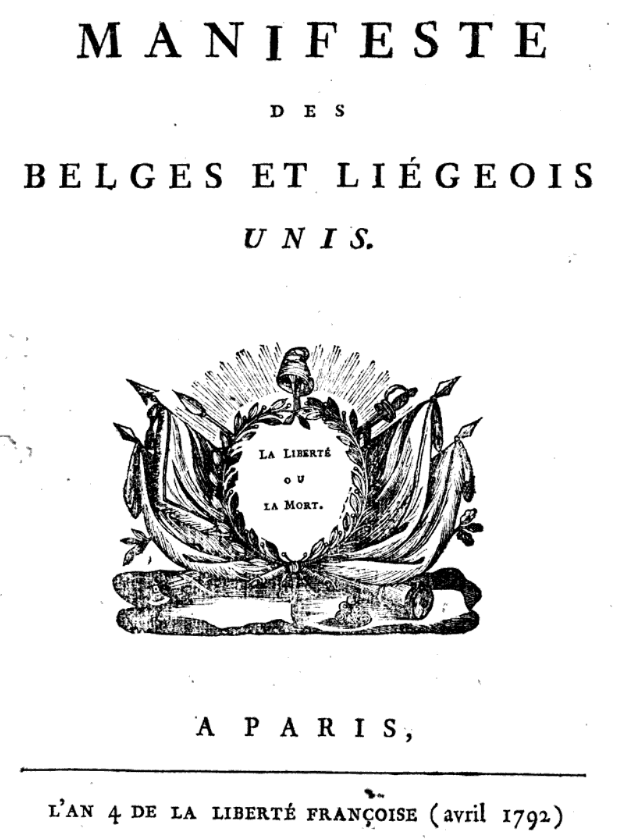
First page of the Committee's Manifesto of the United Belgians and Liégeois (French version).

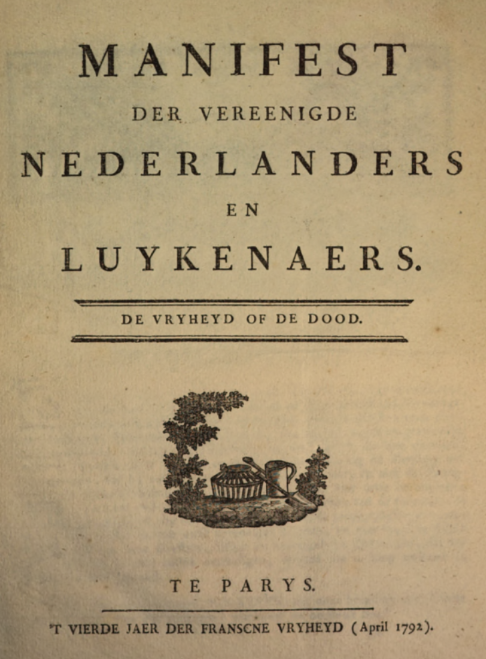
First page of the Committee's Manifesto of the United Nederlanders and Liégeois (Dutch version).

The Committee of United Belgians and Liégeois (Dutch: Comité der Vereenigde Nederlanders en Luykenaers; French: Comité général des Belges et Liégeois Unis) or United Committee of Both Nations (Dutch: Vereenigd Comité der beyde Natien; French: Comité uni des deux Nations) was a political committee in Revolutionary France which brought together leaders of the failed Brabant and Liège Revolutions (1789–1791) who sought to create an independent republic in Belgium.

== Goals ==
The Committee stated in its Manifesto of the United Belgians and Liégeois (published in French and Dutch), that although the desired revolution had failed, another opportunity should be awaited to 'liberate the fatherland'. The Committee stated that a revolution was necessary because: all citizens are equal and collectively have popular sovereignty.

== Constitution ==
A constitution, largely based on the French Constitution of 1791, should guarantee this civil equality and sovereignty. Among other things, it:

- included a modified Declaration of the Rights of Man and of the Citizen
- defined the most important state institutions
- defined citizenship,
- offered a mechanism for maintaining separation of powers
- defined election protocols for a representative assembly.
- established a 50-member Revolutionary Power chosen by the Committee

The Revolutionary Power would provide provisional governance until institutions were formed and elections were held.

The form of the new republic was imagined as follows:

I. The Belgian, previously Austrian provinces, and the Land of Liège will make up one single state under the name of Belgian Republic.

II. This Republic will be a representative democracy: the representatives will be the Legislative Body and the Council.
III. Its territory will be subdivided into districts, and the districts into municipalities.
IV. All inhabitants of the Republic, which are considered to be active citizens according to the hereafter stipulated characteristics, will elect representatives to whom the nation will confide either legislative, executive or judicial power for a certain period of time which was specified.

V. All active citizens who make up every district or municipality will have the right, according to the manner which will be specified hereafter, to elect from their midst the persons who will, under the title of municipal magistrates or servants of the municipalities, be burdened for a period of time with observing the specific interests of said districts and municipalities.

== History ==
It was founded in January 1792 in Paris by the refugee leaders of the Brabant revolution and the Happy revolution. The refugees who were exiled to France made efforts towards the liberation of the Austrian Netherlands and the Prince-Bishopric of Liège from Austrian Habsburg rule. They sought to model their republic after the 1791 French Constitution. They relied on the French military aid to realise it.

Since the mid-18th century the area was increasingly called la Belgique in French – after ancient Gallia Belgica – instead of les Pays-Bas, while in Dutch it was referred to as Nederland or de Nederlanden.

=== Paris ===
In Paris, the Committee lobbied the leaders of the evolving French Revolution to invade Southern Netherlands. The Committee influenced the Minister of Foreign Affairs Charles-François Dumouriez, who, in the run-up to the War of the First Coalition (declared by France on Austria on 20 April 1792), put great confidence in the Committee's assurances that the Belgians and Liégeois would spontaneously rise in rebellion against the Austrians as soon as French troops crossed the borders. In March 1792, Dumouriez stated to his fellow ministers:

As soon as the French army enters the Belgian provinces, it will be helped by the people, who are ashamed of their own futile revolutionary efforts [of 1789–1790]. They will join forces with our troops and will easily drive the dispersed hordes of Austrian mercenaries from their towns or scatter them. Paris will be defended on the banks of the Meuse. For the Country of Liège, the one most worthy of freedom of all those who have raised its flag, our negotiators will depart to dictate the wise peace, which we will under no circumstances spoil by the spirit of conquest.

=== War of the First Coalition ===
The uprising supported by France was prepared by the French government. The Liégeois revolutionary Pierre Henri Hélène Marie Lebrun-Tondu was appointed by Dumouriez as the coordinator of the Belgian-Liégeois operation in Paris, while Hugues-Bernard Maret functioned as the primary liaison with the revolutionaries in the Netherlands and Liège.

A Southern Netherlands/Liège army of exiles was formed in Lille as the Belgian Legion. The Committee moved there and in May, Maret was elected to chair the Committee. Maret and Jan Frans Vonck, former leader of the eponymous Vonckists, reached an agreement with the French government that it would arm and equip two legions of insurgents that would join the French army until the Austrian army's defeat. Afterwards, these legions would be transferred to the Committee, which would set up a provisional government of the would-be Belgian Republic. Eventually, three Belgian corps and one Liégeois corps were formed which would battle the Austrians throughout 1792, jointly with the French.

== See also ==
- Manifesto of the People of Brabant
- Manifesto of the Province of Flanders
- Treaty of Union (1790)
