= Manifesto of the Province of Flanders =

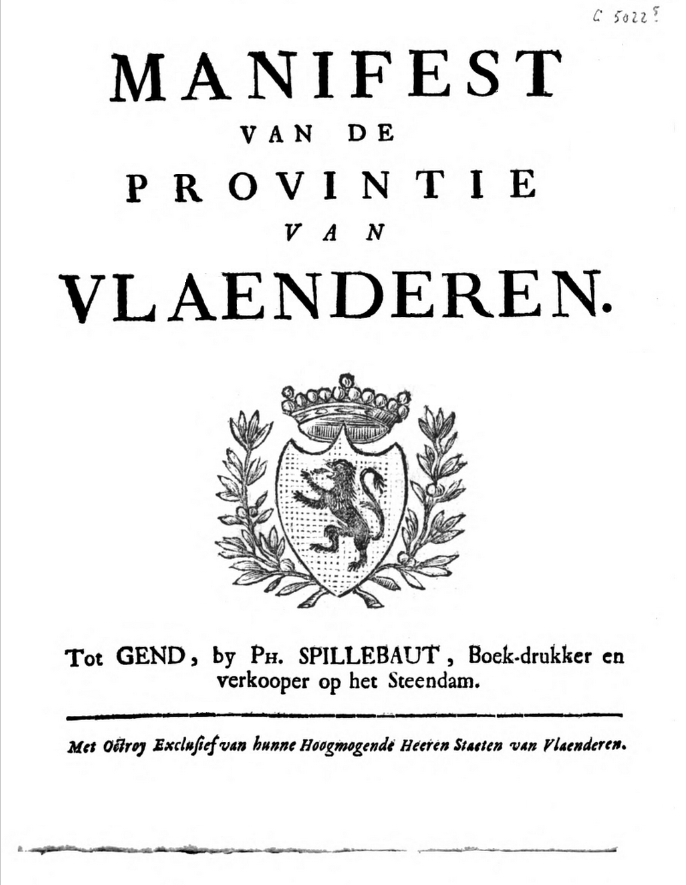
Title page of the Manifesto of the Province of Flanders.

The Manifesto of the Province of Flanders (1790 Dutch: Manifest van de Provintie van Vlaenderen; modern Dutch: Manifest van de Provincie Vlaanderen) was the declaration of independence of the County of Flanders on 4 January 1790, during the Brabantine Revolution. On this day, the States of Flanders "solemnly declare[d] in the name of the People, the province of Flanders to be an independent State, and definitively withdrawn from its loyalty and obedience to emperor Joseph II, count of Flanders, and from the House of Austria." The States also declared "all officials, lieges and other servants, whoever they may be, free and absolved from all concluded and indebted contracts, and discharged from every oath done to the fallen count of Flanders."

Resistance against the reign of Joseph II in the Austrian Netherlands, which worsened in 1786–87 when a number of States refused to pay their taxes (beden) and the landvoogden reversed all reform decrees on their own authority, escalated to open rebellion in the course of 1789, heavily influenced by the simultaneous French Revolution and Liège Revolution which had commenced a few months earlier. On 24 October 1789, Hendrik van der Noot had already proclaimed the independence of the Duchy of Brabant by the Manifesto of the People of Brabant, abjuring Joseph II as the duke of Brabant. From Breda in the Dutch Republic, a small army of patriots first conquered Brabant, next Flanders, Hainaut, Tournai and the Tournaisis, Namur and the rest of the Southern Netherlands except Luxembourg, finally taking Brussels in December.

The manifesto elaborates why the Habsburg princes had not fulfilled their "constitutional" duties, and therefore, the abjuration of Joseph II's right to rule was justified. After summing up all violations of their rightful freedoms, the States of Flanders conclude: "Thus, one sought to subject the brave Netherlanders to complete slavery, and treat them like the inhabitants of Moravia and Croatia." The text composed in Dutch and French by Karel Jozef de Graeve, Jean-Joseph Raepsaet and Maarten de Bast. The ideas expressed in the manifesto were primarily inspired by the United States Declaration of Independence (1776).

The States of the respective Southern Netherlandish provinces united in a new confederal republic, the United Belgian States (7 January – 11 December 1790), which was reconquered after eleven months by the Imperial army.
