= Petronilla van Outryve =

Flemish noblewoman and political activist

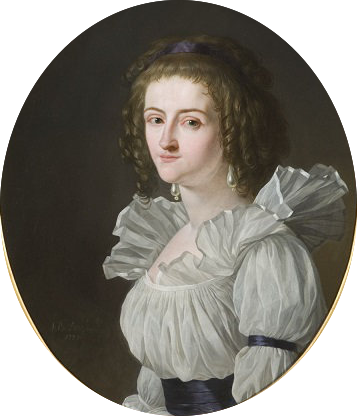

Petronilla van Outryve (1748, Damme – 1814, Bruges), was a Flemish noblewoman, businesswoman and political activist, known for her participation in the Brabant Revolution. She renounced her titles and became known as Madame Stappens. She was the founder of the Jacobin Club in Bruges, hosted the political meetings during the revolution and encouraged and influenced its policies. A street was named after her.

== Life ==
Petronilla van Outryve was born to a rich businessman from Bruges. She married a nobleman in 1773, but separated from him in 1779, and attained the right to manage her own affairs in her legal separation agreement. She was a part-owner of the import-export firm of her birth family, and participated actively in it.

She belonged to the progressive intelligentia that supported the ideals of the French revolution and the liberation from Austrian rule. She hosted a literary salon which became a center of radicals, revolutionaries and progressive intellectuals. She supported the Brabant Revolution of 1789 and the establishment of the United States of Belgium. Many political meetings during the revolution was hosted by her in her home, and she encouraged and influenced the policy of the new state.

After the return of the Austrians in 1791, she became the founder of the Jacobin Club in Bruges. The Club became an important political center of the opposition against Astrian rule, and she was placed under observation by the Austrian police.

After the introduction of French rule in 1794, she retired from politics and lived a private life, devoted to participation in her family business.
