= Manifesto of the People of Brabant =

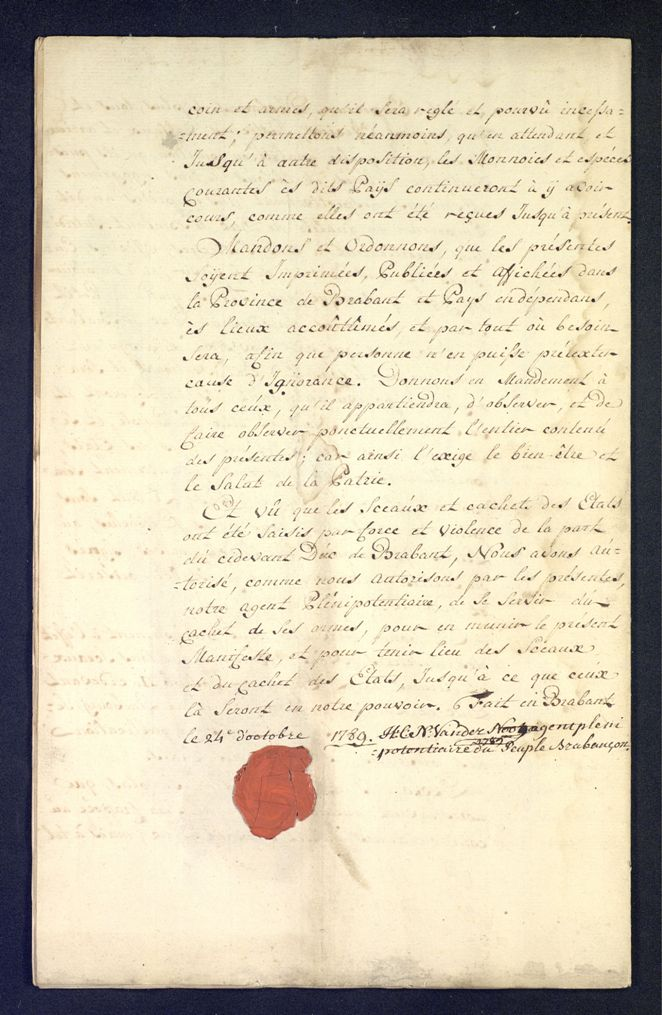
First page of the manuscript of the Manifesto (in French).

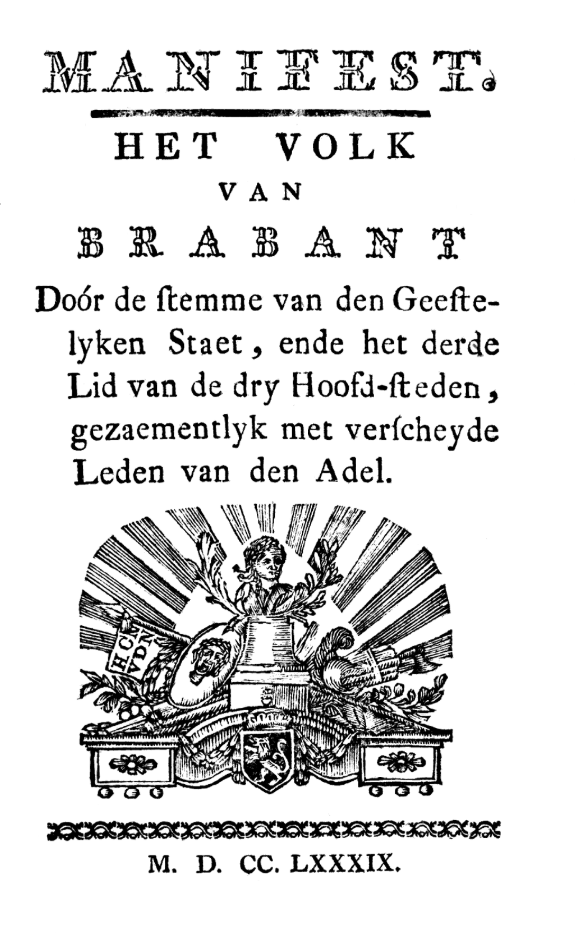
Title page of the printed version of the Manifesto (in Dutch).

The Manifesto of the People of Brabant (French: Manifeste du peuple brabançon, Dutch: Manifest van het Brabantse Volk) was a document made public at the start of the Brabant Revolution in 1789 proclaiming the end of the domination of the House of Austria over the Duchy of Brabant. It was first written in French and then printed in French and Dutch.

== Background ==
In October 1789, the leader of the "Statists", Henri Van der Noot and the general Jean-André van der Meersch led a small army of patriots from the Dutch Republic where they had been in exile into the Duchy of Brabant, then under Austrian rule. The first significant town liberated was Hoogstraten and it was there that van der Noot made the declaration public to his army.

== Manifesto ==
The manifesto was first read on 24 October 1789 in the town of Hoogstraten, though it had been published on the previous day by the Committee of Breda.

The Duke of Brabant was obliged by the terms of the Joyous Entry to respect the privileges of the people of Brabant. The element which sparked the revolution was the infringement of the terms, meaning that the declaration also declared Duke Joseph of Brabant deposed from his position.

The declaration led, in January 1790, to the establishment of the United Belgian States.

== See also ==
- Brabant Revolution
- Committee of United Belgians and Liégeois
- Manifesto of the Province of Flanders
- Treaty of Union (1790)
