= Vonckists =

Political faction in the United Belgian States

Vonckists Vonckisten Vonckistes
- Leader: Jan Frans Vonck
- Founded: 1780s
- Banned: 1790
- Preceded by: Pro Aris et Focis
- Merged into: Committee of United Belgians and Liégeois; Jacobin Club (mostly Girondins)
- Ideology: Liberalism; Progressivism; Republicanism; Belgian nationalism Factions: Centralism; Francophilia; Anti-clericalism
- Political position: Left-wing (Note: Left-wing by contemporary standards)
- National affiliation: Patriots

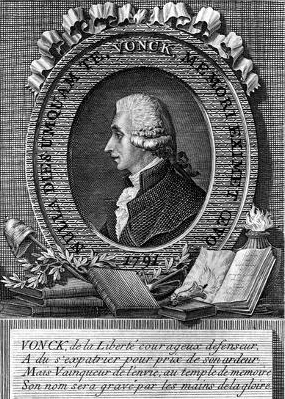
Portrait of Jan Frans Vonck, 1791

The Vonckists (Dutch: vonckisten; French: vonckistes) or Democrats (Dutch: democraten; French: démocrates) were a progressive political faction active in the Austrian Netherlands and later the United Belgian States during the Brabant Revolution (1789–1790). They were led by Jan Frans Vonck and were opposed to the more conservative "Statists", although they did initially ally with them for the sake of liberating the Southern Netherlands.

== History ==
The group emerged from the secret society Pro aris et focis in the 1780s, and by 1789 had become a distinct faction. The Vonckists called for Belgian independence from the Habsburg monarchy under a popular government along the model seen during the French Revolution. After the proclamation of the United Belgian States in January 1790, the Vonckists were denounced as anticlerical by the Statists and many were hunted down by mobs in what was known as the "Summer Terror". Jan Frans Vonck and many other Vonckist leaders were forced into exile in France.

Due to the initial persecutions by the Statists and the later suppression of the revolution by the Habsburgs, many Vonckists would flee to France. There, together with leaders of the failed Liège Revolution, they formed the Committee of United Belgians and Liégeois, aimed at restoring Belgian independence, as well as merging with the Prince-Bishopric of Liège into a single state. The committee also closely collaborated with the French government.

Following the French annexation of Belgium, many former Vonckists would join Jacobin clubs, mainly Girondin ones, though some more radical Vonckists joined the Montagnards.

== Ideology ==
As opposed to the conservative Statists, the Vonckists were progressive and liberal, advocating for a government based on that of the contemporary French constitutional monarchy, except for the monarchy itself which the Vonckists did away with entirely.

Most Vonckists did not particularly want to change anything about the status of the Catholic Church and religion, though a small faction was anti-clerical.

== Prominent members ==
- Jan Frans Vonck
- Jean-André van der Mersch
- Jan-Baptist Verlooy
- Jacques Meyer
- Charles-Lambert Doutrepont

== See also ==
- United Belgian States
- Brabant Revolution
- Statists (Belgium)
- Dutch Patriots

== Sources ==
- Vanden Berghe, Yvan. Jacobijnen en Traditionalisten. De reacties van de Bruggelingen in de Revolutietijd (1780-1794)
