= Belgian nationalism =

Ideology in favor of a strong centralized government of Belgium

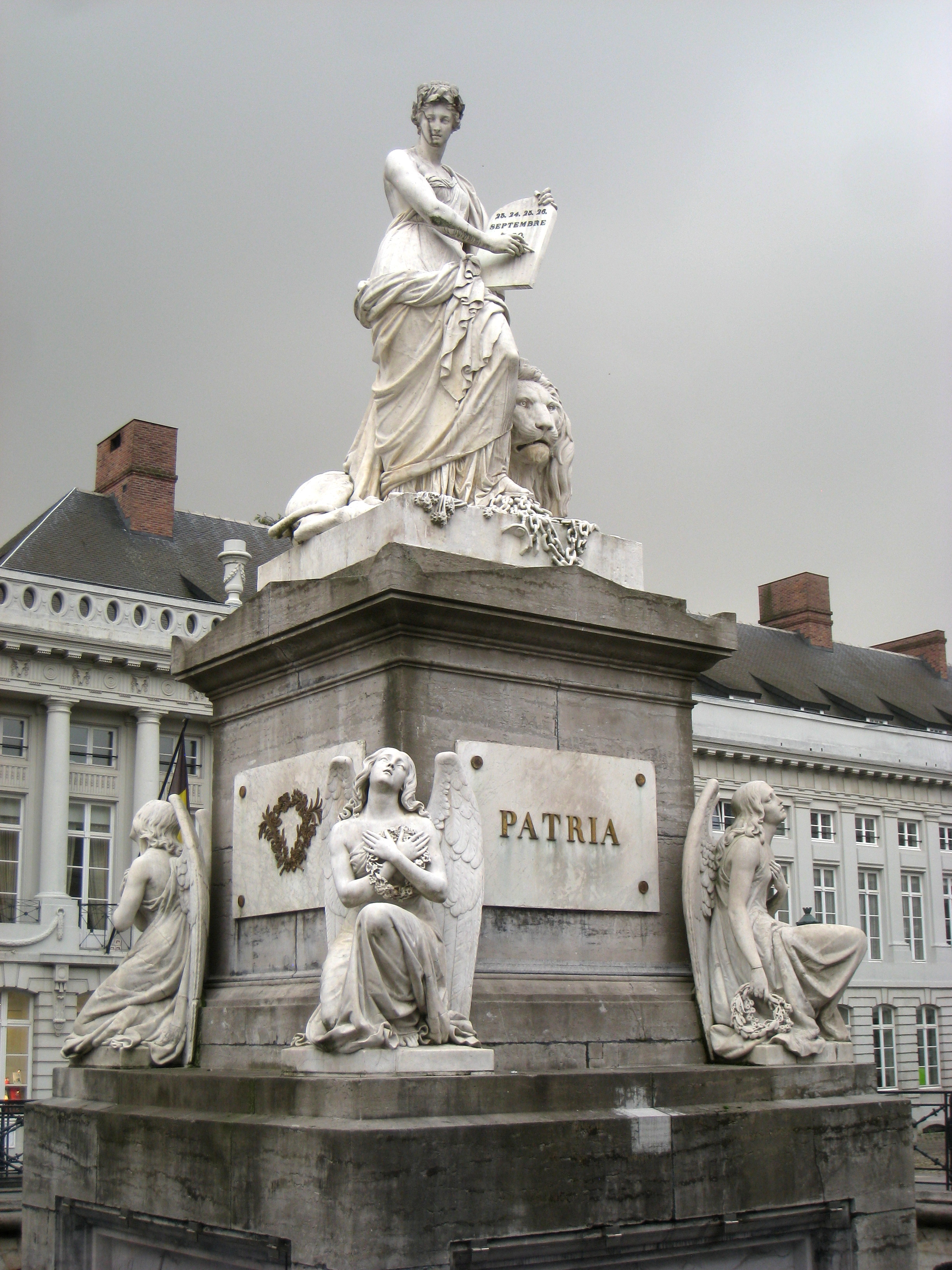
The Monument to the Martyrs of the 1830 Revolution (or Pro Patria Monument), commemorating the Belgian Revolution, in the Place des Martyrs/Martelaarsplein, Brussels

Belgian nationalism, sometimes pejoratively referred to as Belgicism (Dutch: Belgicisme; French: Belgicanisme), is a nationalist ideology. In its modern form it favours the reversal of federalism and the creation of a unitary state in Belgium. The ideology advocates reduced or no autonomy for the Flemish Community, who constitutes Flanders; the French and German communities, who constitute Wallonia; and the Brussels-Capital Region, which is inhabited by both Walloons and Flemings, as well as the dissolution of the regional counterparts of each ethnic group within Belgium.

It insists on restoring total sovereignty to the level of the Belgian state by reverting Belgium to a unitary state, after decades of state structure reforms that made Belgium a federal state since the 1970s. This position is contrary to Flemish nationalists who advocate the independence of their region, and Walloon, Brussels and German-speaking regionalists who advocate more autonomy to their respective regions. Belgian nationalists advocate the unity between all language groups in Belgium, and condemn each perceived chauvinistic or linguistic discrimination, advocate the knowledge of all official languages (Dutch, French, German) and a multicultural, tolerant, strong feeling of citizenship.

Belgian nationalism is mainly supported by French-speaking politicians and certain circles in Brussels and also some sections of the far right. Because the Flanders region is by large majority regionalist (with a minority seeking independence) and because both the Wallonia and Brussels regions and the German community are also by majority regionalist, there is no popular support for Belgian nationalism in any region of Belgium, and political parties that support this ideology openly have not gained electoral support in the modern era (although the Workers' Party of Belgium, which opposes regionalism and dividing the country by language but is not nationalist, saw its support rise in the late 2010s), so it remains much weaker than the secessionist and regional nationalisms of the ethnic groups.

== History ==
Belgian nationalism first emerged during the Brabant Revolution (1789–1790), when the Austrian Netherlands rebelled against Habsburg rule, creating the short-lived United Belgian States in what is now Belgium, which only lasted from January to December 1790.

It again emerged in 1830 during the Belgian Revolution, when Belgium rebelled against and gained independence from the United Kingdom of the Netherlands.

One of the first people to create an intellectual foundation for Belgian nationalism was the Walloon historian Henri Pirenne, who argued for the existence of a distinct Belgian nation in his book series Histoire de Belgique.

== Advocates ==
=== Current ===
- Belgian Union (BUB), a centrist unionist political party, officially bilingual but in practice mainly Dutch-speaking.
- Démocratie Nationale, the heir of Front National (National Front), a French-speaking nationalist far-right political party which changed its name in 2012.
- Reformist Movement (MR), whose current president Georges-Louis Bouchez has stated that he would like to see Belgium become a unitary state again.
- Workers' Party of Belgium (PTB-PVDA), a far-left and only bilingual party represented in parliament, advocating for a stronger federal government.
- L'unie, a Belgian centrist political party aiming for Belgian unitarism

=== Past ===
- Historically, both the fascist (Francophone) Rexist Party and (Dutch-speaking) Verdinaso both advocated a version of corporatist identity centered on Belgian nationalism. Verdinaso was dissolved in 1941, while Rex was banned for collaboration with Nazi Germany after the Second World War.
- During the Brabant Revolution, both the conservative Statists and progressive Vonckists advocated for an independent Belgium from Austrian rule.

== See also ==
- Flemish nationalism – an ideology calling for greater autonomy or independence for Flanders
- Greater Netherlands – a hypothetical polity incorporating Flanders and the Netherlands.
- Walloon nationalism – an ideology calling for greater autonomy or independence for Wallonia
- Rattachism – an ideology calling for the separation of Wallonia and its incorporation into France
- Flamingant – an originally pejorative term for adherents to the Flemish Movement
