= Sovereign Congress (United Belgian States) =

Sovereign Congress Souverain Congrès Soevereine Congres
- Belgic Lion

Type
- Type: Unicameral

History
- Established: 11 January 1790
- Disbanded: 2 December 1790
- Preceded by: None
- Succeeded by: National Congress

Leadership
- Presidents: François de Nélis, Statist; Hendrik van Crumpipen, Statist

Meeting place
- Brussels

The Sovereign Congress (French: Souverain Congrès; Dutch: Soevereine Congres), was the legislative assembly created on 11 January 1790 by the Treaty of Union which established the United Belgian States. Its primary task was to manage the sovereignty of the independent territories of the United States of Belgium during the Brabant Revolution.

== Presidents of the Sovereign Congress ==
- François de Nélis, Bishop of Antwerp (11 January 1790 – 8 November 1790)
- Hendrik van Crumpipen (8 November 1790 – 2 December 1790)

== See also ==
- National Congress of Belgium
