= Austrian Netherlands kronenthaler =

Currency of the Austrian Netherlands

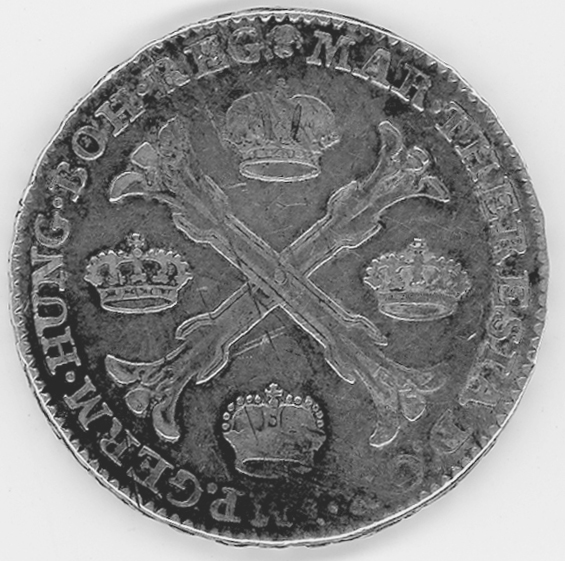
Burgundian Cross with 4 crowns

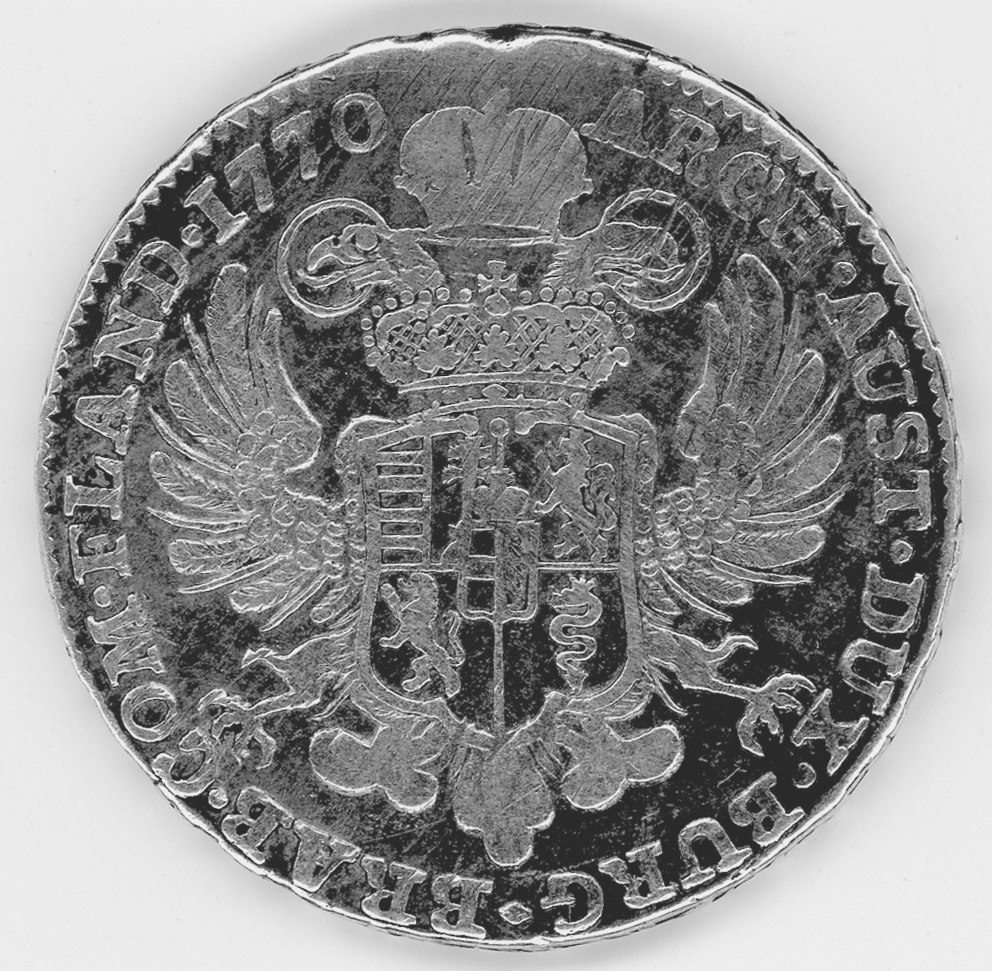
Eagle and arms

Maria Theresia Kronenthaler in 1770

The kronenthaler was the currency of the Austrian Netherlands from 1744. It was equivalent to 216 liards, 54 sols, 54 stuivers, or 2.7 gulden. During the Brabant Revolution in 1789–90, it was briefly replaced by a short-lived revolutionary currency. Following the French occupation of the Austrian Netherlands in 1794, the Kronenthaler was replaced by the French franc.

Although it was legally valued at just 2.675 gulden in the Netherlands and 2.64 gulden in several Southern German states, its acceptance at these places for 2.7 gulden caused significant disruption in the valuations of the Dutch gulden and the South German gulden; see Kronenthaler.

== See also ==
- Kronenthaler
- Coinage of the United States of Belgium (1790)
