= Brabant Revolution coinage =

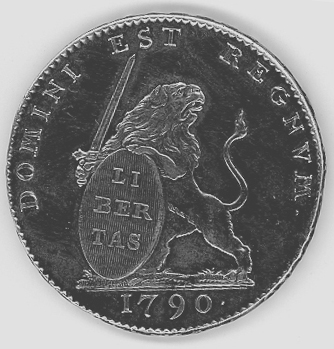
A silver 3 Florin coin of the United Belgian States, minted in 1790.

The coinage of the United Belgian States was only produced during the state's one-year existence in 1790, following the Brabant Revolution, but provided a strong numismatic influence for the coinage of Belgium after its independence in 1830.

== Background ==
In 1789, Brabant Revolution took place in reaction to liberal reforms made by Joseph II and the Austrian rule in Belgium. After Austrian forces were defeated by the rebels at the Battle of Turnhout in 1789, Austrian forces withdrew from the country leaving the rebels in power. On 11 January 1790, with the signing of the Treaty of Union, the counties and duchies which had made up the Austrian Netherlands became one country: the United Belgian States.

== Coinage ==
The coinage was issued in eight denominations divided into Liards, Sols, and Florins. It was only produced during the short one-year lifespan of the country meaning that all examples are dated 1790. Legends are rendered in Latin. The ten Sols & Florin coins were given a new legend after it turned out that VNIONE also meant "onion" in the locally spoken languages.

The types minted were:

Denomination	Description	Legend	Metal	Photograph
Liard	Reverse: Rampant lion holding stylised liberty pole Obverse: Text	AD USUM FŒDERATI BELGII "For Use in the Belgian Federation"	Copper alloy	
Double Liard	Reverse: Rampant lion holding stylised liberty pole Obverse: Laureate wreath surrounding text	AD USUM FŒDERATI BELGII	Copper alloy	
Ten Sols (first type)	Reverse: Two disembodied hands shaking above 11 crossed arrows Obverse: Rampant lion	MON. NOV. ARG. PROV. FOED. BELG. / IN VNIONE SALVS "New Silver Money of the Federated Provinces of Belgium" / "Salvation in Union"	Silver	
Ten Sols (second type)	Reverse: Two disembodied hands shaking above 11 crossed arrows Obverse: Rampant lion	DOMINI EST REGNVM / ET IPSE DOMINABITVR GENTIVM "The Kingdom is the Lord's; and he shall have dominion over the nations" (Psalm 22:28)	Silver	
Florin (first type)	Reverse: Two disembodied hands shaking above 11 crossed arrows Obverse: Rampant lion	MON. NOV. ARG. PROV. FOED. BELG. / IN VNIONE SALVS	Silver	
Florin (second type)	Reverse: Two disembodied hands shaking above 11 crossed arrows Obverse: Rampant lion	DOMINI EST REGNVM / ET IPSE DOMINABITVR GENTIVM	Silver	
Three Florins	Reverse: Lion regardant, brandishing sword and a shield labelled Libertas; Obverse: 11 coats of arms around a central sun	DOMINI EST REGNVM / ET IPSE DOMINABITVR GENTIVM	Silver	
14 Florins	Reverse: Lion regardant, brandishing sword and a shield labelled Libertas; Obverse: 11 coats of arms around a central sun	DOMINI EST REGNVM / ET IPSE DOMINABITVR GENTIVM	Gold	

=== Iconography ===
The iconography on the coinage stressed the unity of the state. On the 3 Florin, this was represented by the individual display of all the coats-of-arms of the 11 states which had merged; on the 10 sols, it was represented by 11 arrows behind a two shaking hands.
