= Revolutions without Borders =

- Author: Janet Polasky
- Publisher: Yale University Press
- Publication date: 2015

Revolutions without Borders - the Call to Liberty in the Atlantic World is a 2015 history of the revolutions in the Atlantic world inspired by and fought in the immediate wake of the American and French Revolutions written by historian Janet Polasky.

Polasky argues that the American Revolution, and the essays and arguments of its leaders, directly inspired a series of revolutions (some successful; most not) including the Geneva Revolution of 1782, the 1787 "Patriot Revolution" in the Dutch Republic, the Belgian "small revolution" of 1789, and the French Revolution itself. In her view, the literature and ideas of the American and French revolutionists converged to inspire a long series of revolutions at the end of the 18th century and in the early years of the 19th.
