= Statists (Belgium) =

Political faction in the United Belgian States

Statists Statisten Statistes
- Leader: Henri van der Noot
- Founded: 1780s
- Dissolved: 1790s
- Ideology: Conservatism; Clericalism; Belgian nationalism Confederalism; Republicanism
- Political position: Right-wing
- Religion: Catholicism
- National affiliation: Patriots

The Statists (Dutch: statisten; French: statistes) or Aristocrats (Dutch: aristocraten; French: aristocrates) were a conservative political faction active in the Austrian Netherlands and later the United Belgian States during the Brabant Revolution (1789–1790). They were led by Henri Van der Noot and fiercely opposed to the more radical "Vonckist" faction, led by Jan Frans Vonck, although they did initially ally with them for the sake of liberating Belgium.

== History ==
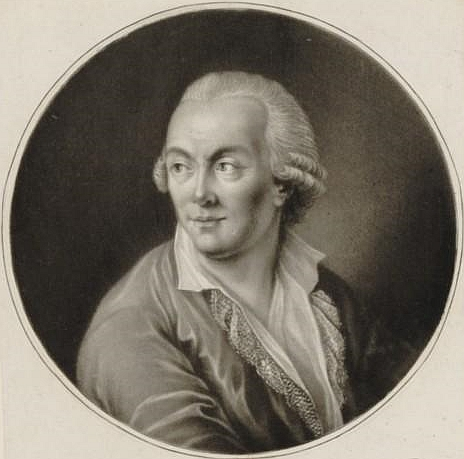
Henri Van der Noot, leader of the Statist Faction. 1790

The Statists initially tried to bring about a revocation of the reforms of the Habsburg Emperor Joseph II which they perceived as an attack on regional freedom. In 1787 they organized a wave of uprisings and rioting known as the Small Revolution and the resulting crackdown by the Austrian forces forced Van der Noot and his Statists into exile in the Dutch Republic. The Statists supported Belgian independence but their main area of concern was protecting the local privileges and the Catholic Church. After the proclamation of the United States of Belgium, the Statists managed to exclude the Vonckists from government and forced them into exile. The new Belgian state was short-lived as Habsburg rule was restored at the end of 1790, forcing the Statists from power.

== Ideology ==
The Statists were ideologically reactionary, opposing the liberal reforms of Joseph II. Furthermore, they actively defended many elements of the ancien régime, championed regional autonomy, and the status of the Belgian Catholic Church.

In terms of government, the Statists favoured a confederation and were largely republican, though monarchist factions did exist. When the Austrians returned to Belgium in late 1790, the Statists offered to make Belgium a monarchy with Charles Habsburg, third son of Emperor Leopold II, as grand duke of Belgium in exchange for maintaining the country's independence, though these plans never materialised.

In 1789, Van der Noot proposed some sort of union between Belgium and the Dutch Republic, though such plans were turned down by the latter, who viewed them with suspicion.

== Prominent members ==
- Henri Van der Noot
- Jeanne de Bellem
- Peter van Eupen

== See also ==
- United Belgian States
- Brabant Revolution
- Vonckists
- Treaty of Union (1790)
- Manifesto of the People of Brabant

== Sources ==
- Polasky, Janet. The Brabant Revolution, "a Revolution in Historiographical Perception"
- Vanden Berghe, Yvan. Jacobijnen en Traditionalisten. De reacties van de Bruggelingen in de Revolutietijd (1780-1794)
