= Battle of Falmagne =

1790 battle of Brabant Revolution

- Part of the Brabant Revolution
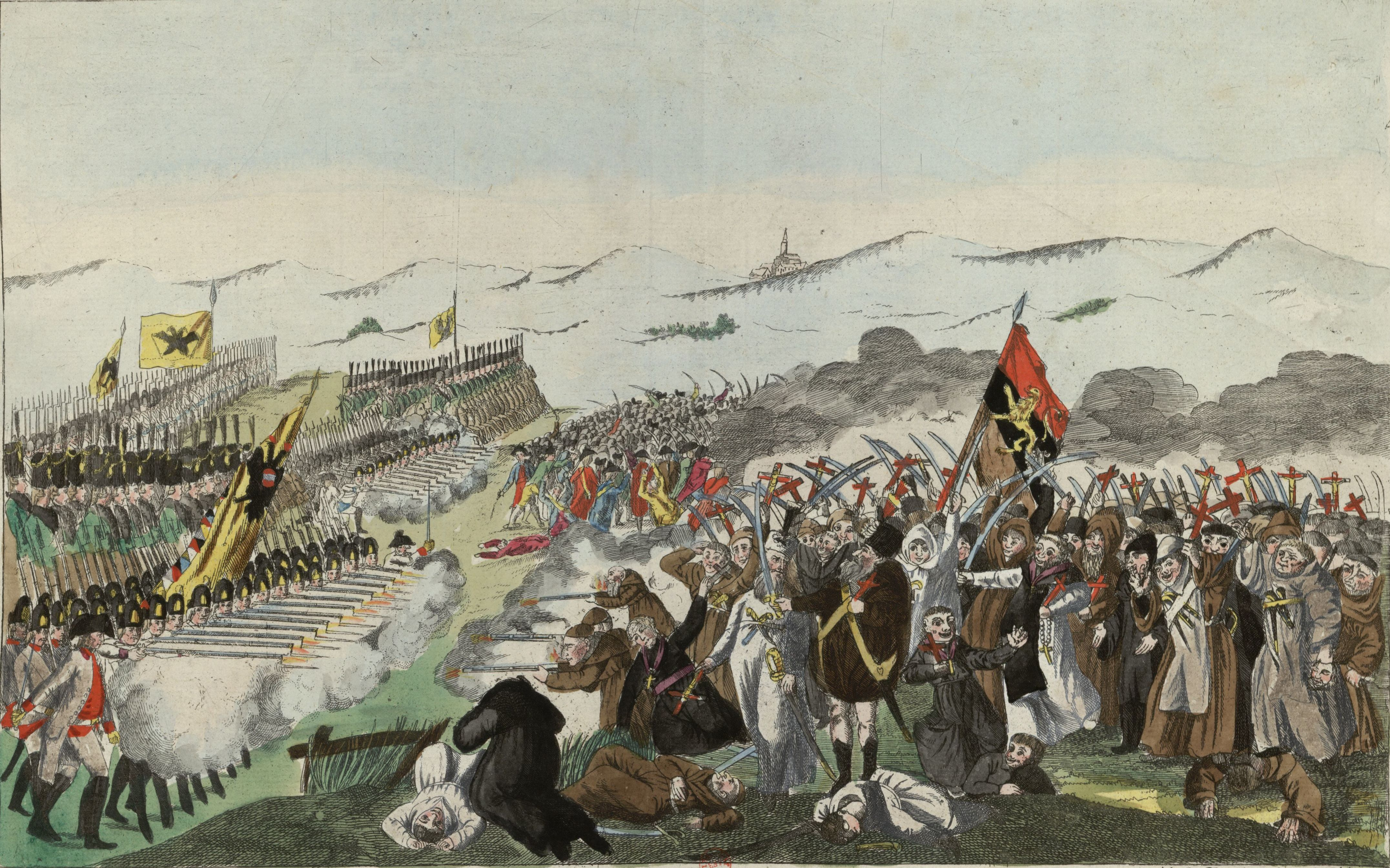
- 1790 illustration of the battle
Date	22 September 1790
Location	Falmagne (near Dinant), Austrian Netherlands
Result	Austrian victory

Belligerents
Austria	United Belgian States

Commanders and leaders
Baron von Bender; Franz von Bleckheim †	George Koehler; Nikolaus Heinrich von Schönfeld

Strength
15,000	7,000

Casualties and losses
Unknown	Unknown

The Battle of Falmagne (French: Bataille de Falmagne, Dutch: Slag bij Falmagne) was fought during the Brabant Revolution between the Holy Roman Empire and the United Belgian States on 22 September 1790. A volunteer force of 5,000 Belgian revolutionaries with four cannons, led by General George Koehler, crossed the river Maas at Moniat on 22 September 1790 to attack the heights of Anseremme and Falmagne. (Note: Anseremme and Falmagne were old communes of the city of Dinant.) A second force of 2,000 troops crossed the Maas further south at Hastière in order to prevent the Austrian troops stationed at Blaimont reinforcing the attacked troops at Falmagne.

The Belgian troops briefly captured the Anseremme heights and took possession of several enemy cannons. When Austrian cavalry troops reinforced the outpost and two of the Belgian powder carts exploded they were soon forced back over the Maas river. On the southern front the Belgian troops captured three cannons and took 30 enemy troops captive but soon fell into disarray and also retreated across the river. General Nikolaus Heinrich von Schönfeld attacked the right-flank of the Austrians with a substantial numerical advantage but his attack was repelled.
