= Treaty of Union (1790) =

Treaty creating United Belgian States

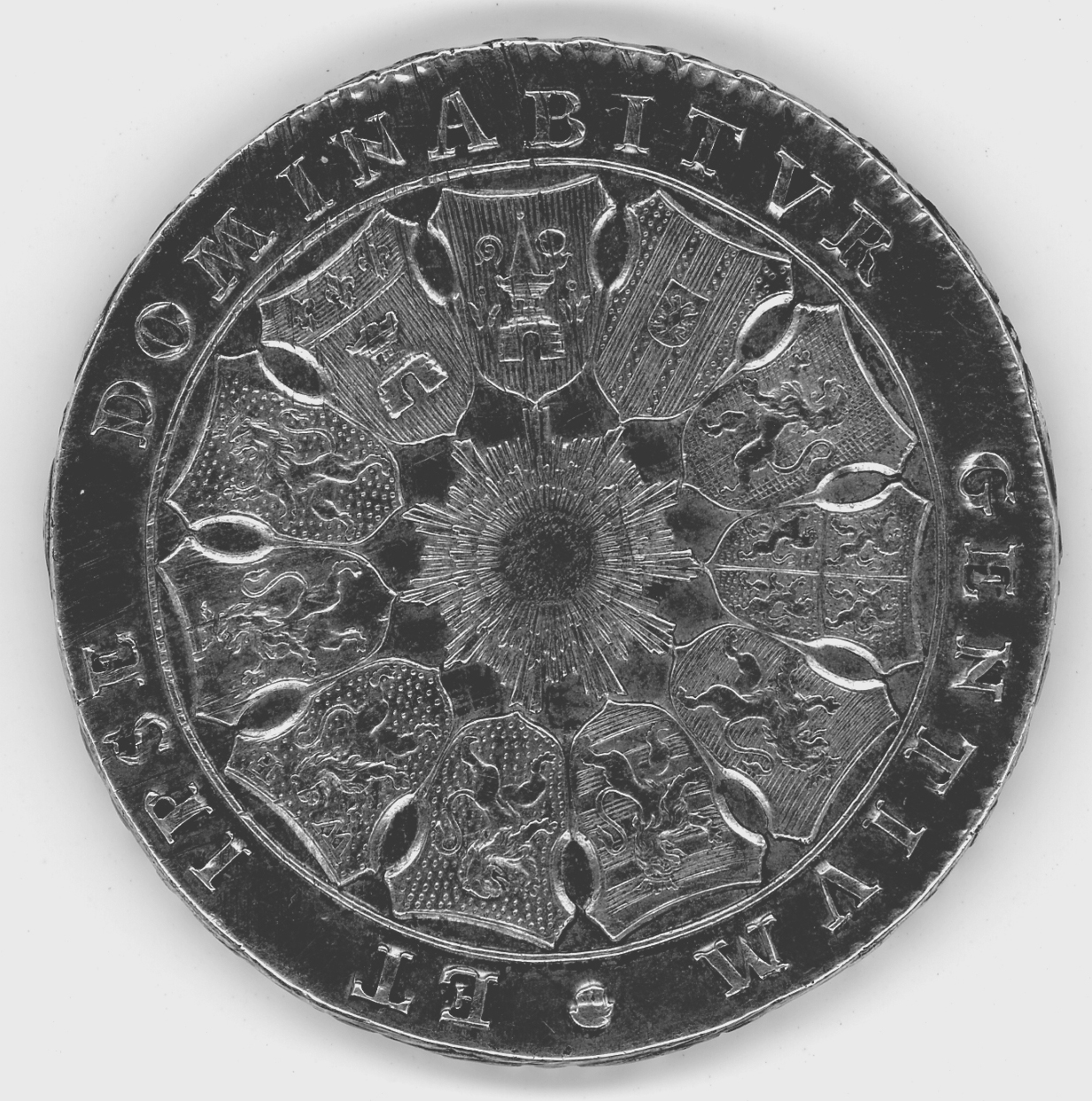
Coin of the United Belgian States depicting the coats of arms of all 11 states which were joined by the Treaty

The Treaty of Union (French: Traité d'Union; Dutch: Tractaet van Vereeninge) was a treaty that led to the creation of the United Belgian States, a confederal republic of territories of the Austrian Netherlands that were in revolt against Emperor Joseph II of Austria during the Brabant Revolution (1789–1790). It was signed by representatives of the provinces of Brabant, Flanders, West-Vlaanderen (1713), Tournai and Tournaisis, Hainaut, Namur, Limburg and the Lands of Overmaas, Austrian Upper Guelders, and Mechelen in the States General of the Southern Netherlands (which thereby reconstituted themselves as the Sovereign Congress) on 11 January 1790, and ratified by the various provinces on 20 January 1790, after which it came into effect. The Duchy of Luxemburg did not sign or ratify the treaty, and therefore never became a part of the United Belgian States.

== Content ==
This section includes a short summary of each article of the treaty.

Article I: The provinces unite into the United Belgian States.

Article II: The provinces give congress the following powers: managing defense, establishing peace and war, raising and maintaining a national army, constructing and maintaining the necessary fortifications, creating alliances with foreign powers, and sending and receiving residents, ambassadors and other agents.

Article III: Each province will send representatives to congress.

Article IV: The provinces are Catholic, will maintain their ties with the Holy See and adhere to the fundamental rules of the Catholic faith. The rights of the Dutch Reformed Church are respected.

Article V: Only congress will be allowed to create coins under the stamp of the United Belgian States.

Article VI: The provinces will provide for the expenses required to maintain congress.

Article VII: The provinces will keep all powers and sovereignty not explicitly given to congress.

Article VIII: In case of disputes between provinces, the congress will have the power to draft a solution.

Article IX: If a province is attacked by a foreign power, all other provinces will join on their side.

Article X: No province will be allowed to enter into an alliance or treaty with a foreign power or to unite with another province without the consent of congress. However, the province of West-Flanders will be allowed to unite with Flanders.

Article XI: No province will be allowed to leave the union for whatever reason.

Article XII: No one may serve in both the military and congress. Also, those who have served under foreign powers will not be allowed to join congress.

== See also ==
- Brabant Revolution
- Committee of United Belgians and Liégeois
- Manifesto of the People of Brabant
- Manifesto of the Province of Flanders
