= Janet Polasky =

American historian

Janet Polasky is the Presidential Professor of History at the University of New Hampshire.

Polasky earned a B.A., at Carleton College in 1973, and a Ph.D from Stanford University in 1978.

== Books ==
- Revolutions without Borders: The Call to Liberty in the Atlantic World (2015, Yale University Press)
- Reforming Urban Labor: Routes to the City, Roots in the Country
- Emile Vandervelde, Le Patron
- The Democratic Socialism of Emile Vandervelde: Between Reform and Revolution
- Revolution in Brussels, 1787-1793
