= Henri Van der Noot =

Belgian politician and leader of the Brabant Revolution

Henri van der Noot
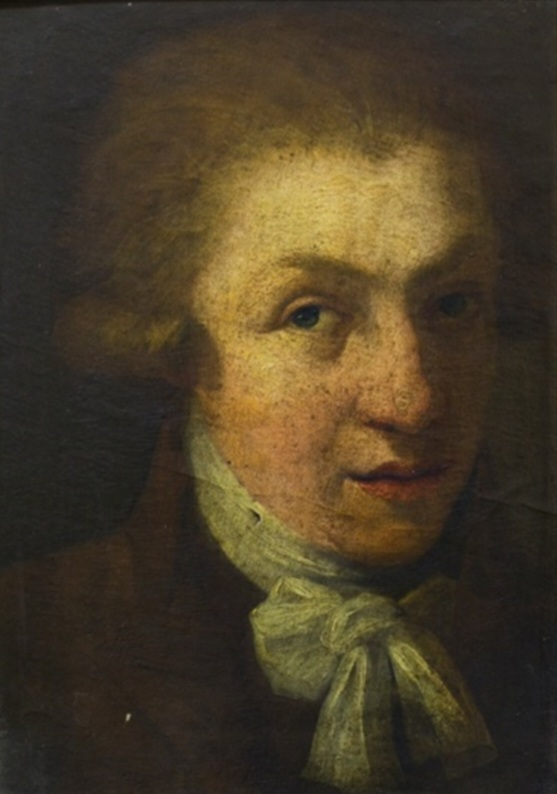
- Portrait c. 1790

President of the National Congress of the United States of Belgium
- In office 11 January 1790 – 2 December 1790
- President: Cornelius Franciscus Nelis; Henri de Crumpipen
- Succeeded by: Étienne de Gerlache (as prime minister of the Kingdom of Belgium)

Personal details
- Born: Henri-Charles-Nicolas van der Noot de Vrechem; 7 January 1731 Brussels, Brabant, Austrian Netherlands
- Died: 12 January 1827 (aged 96) Strombeek, Netherlands
- Party: Statist
- Occupation: Lawyer; writer; politician

Henri van der Noot, in Dutch Hendrik van der Noot, and popularly called Heintje van der Noot or Vader Heintje (7 January 1731 – 12 January 1827), was a jurist, lawyer and politician from Brabant. He was one of the main figures of the Brabant Revolution (1789–1790) against the Imperial rule of Joseph II. This revolution led to the short-lived existence of the United States of Belgium with himself as President of the National Congress (11 January 1790 – 2 December 1790).

== Family ==
Coat of arms of the Van der Noot family.

He was the son of Nicolas van der Noot, Lord of Vrechem and a distant relative of the present Marquess of Assche. On 13 June 1757, he was admitted to the Sweerts Lineage, one of the Seven Noble Houses of Brussels.

== Overview ==
Two lawyers, Jan Frans Vonck and Henri Van der Noot, were the leaders of the revolt but each represented a different faction. The Vonckists were inspired by the same ideals that inspired the French Revolution (1789–1799) and sought a link-up with the people and the patriot army. The Statists led by Van der Noot strived for the restoration of old privileges of the nobility and the church such as the "Joyous Entry" and sought cooperation with the Dutch Republic. However, at the court case of apothecary Elyse Mertens, after witnessing the suspect's organized defense, the two ultimately made the decision to launch a fight together against the crown.

In contrast to Vonck, who was of the opinion that the Belgian people themselves had to fight against the despot of Vienna, Van der Noot had more confidence in obtaining foreign support. In 1788 Van der Noot travelled to England, the Dutch Republic and Prussia to get attention for the cause of Brabant liberty. Only Prussia, which itself had beaten the Dutch patriots in 1787, was inclined to support the Belgian patriots as they were at that time anti-Austrian. Van der Noot had less success seeking support from the last Grand Pensionary of Holland, Laurens Pieter van de Spiegel.

In October 1789 Van der Noot and General Vander Meersch with a small patriot army from Breda captured the entire province of Brabant. In his first concurred (or freed) town, Hoogstraten, Van der Noot published his Manifesto of the Brabant People on 24 October 1789. The document explains why the people of Brabant have the right to disobedience against a ruler. The main argument is that the will of a nation is the highest law and if that is violated by a ruler the nation has the right to revolt against the ruler.

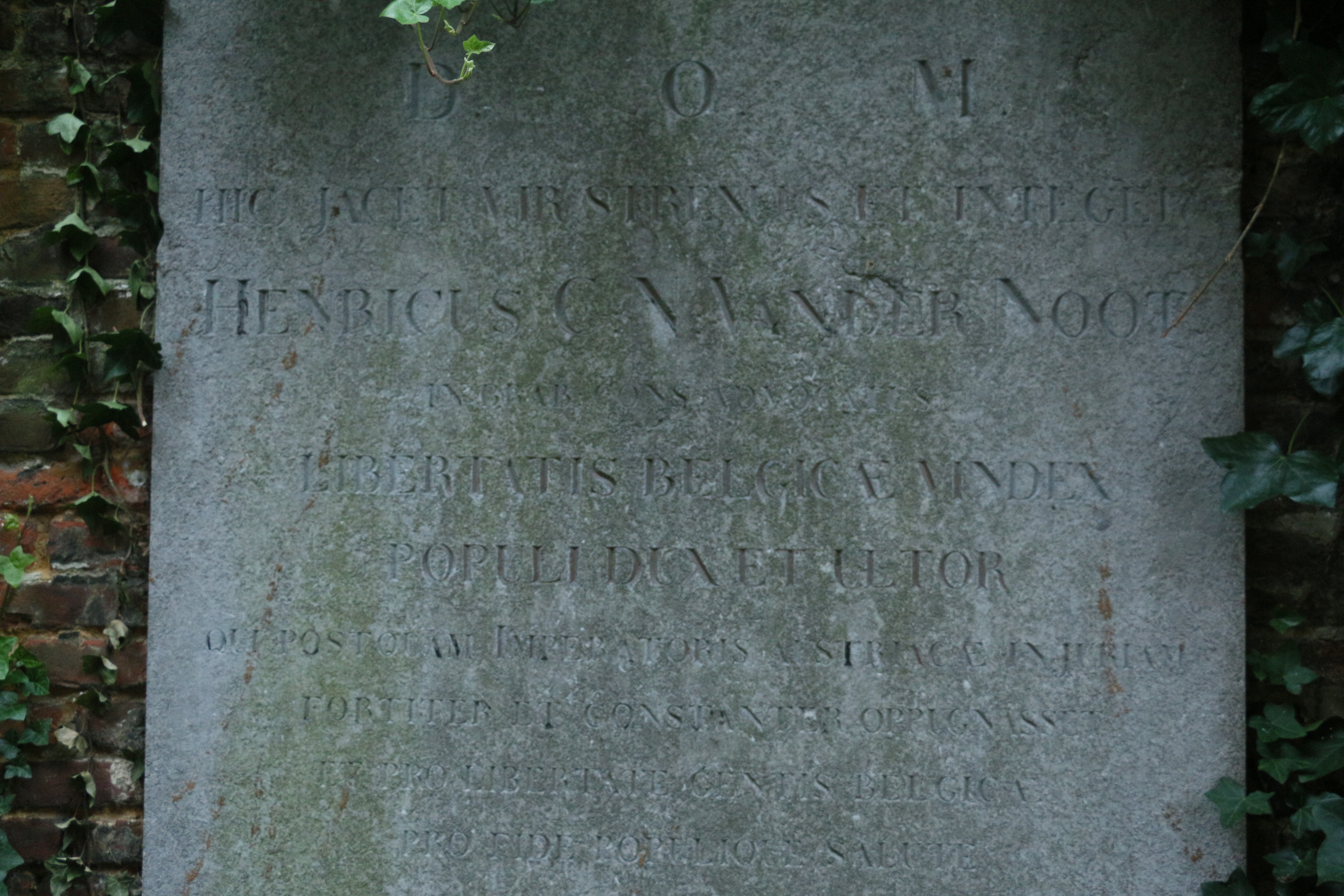
Gravestone of Henri van der Noot at Strombeek-Bever

Van der Noot captured Turnhout, defeating the Imperials in the Battle of Turnhout on 27 October and Ghent was taken on 13 November. On 17 November the imperial regents Albert of Saxony and Archduchess Maria Christina fled Brussels. The remains of the imperial forces withdrew behind the citadel walls of Luxembourg and Antwerp.

Van der Noot declared Brabant independent, and all other provinces of the Austrian Netherlands with the exception of Luxembourg soon followed suit. On 11 January 1790 they signed a pact, establishing a confederation, headed by Van der Noot, under the name Verenigde Nederlandse Staten/États-Belgiques-Unis (United States of Belgium).

When Prussia abandoned the revolt after the signing the Convention of Reichenbach (27 July 1790) with the Holy Roman Empire the fragile state soon came under attack by the Imperials of Leopold II, who had succeeded his brother Joseph II after the latter's death on 20 February 1790. In November 1790 Van der Noot had to flee to the Dutch Republic and thereafter to England. In 1792 he made an appeal for cooperation with the French occupiers (1794–1815). He returned to Brabant but was arrested 1796 and imprisoned in 's Hertogenbosch.

He died in 1827 in Strombeek, and his tomb is located in the wall of the vicar's compound of the Sint-Amandsparochie in Strombeek-Bever.

== See also ==
- Jeanne de Bellem

Political offices
New title	Prime Minister of the United States of Belgium; 11 January 1790 – 2 December 1790	Vacant Title next held by Étienne de Gerlache
