= Brabant Revolution =

1789–90 event in the Austrian Netherlands

- Part of the Atlantic Revolutions
- Flag used for the Brabantine Revolution
- Date: 24 October 1789 – 3 December 1790 (1 year, 40 days)
- Location: Austrian Netherlands (modern-day Belgium)
- Outcome: Widespread dissatisfaction with centralising liberal reforms of Emperor Joseph II after 1784; Temporary overthrow of Austrian rule by an émigré army at the Battle of Turnhout in October 1789 followed by a series of local uprisings; Austrian forces expelled in all parts of the Austrian Netherlands except Luxembourg; Establishment of the United Belgian States in January 1790 with limited support from Prussia; Growing friction between conservative Statist and liberal Vonckist factions; Exile of the Vonckists; Revolutionaries suffer successive military defeats and Austrian rule temporarily re-established in December 1790; Ultimate collapse of Austrian rule during French Revolutionary Wars in 1792–1794

The Brabant Revolution or Brabantine Revolution, (Note: French: Révolution brabançonne; Dutch: Brabantse Omwenteling) sometimes referred to as the Belgian Revolution of 1789–1790, was an armed insurrection that occurred in the Austrian Netherlands (modern-day Belgium) between October 1789 and December 1790. The revolution, which occurred at the same time as revolutions in France and Liège, led to the brief overthrow of Habsburg rule and the proclamation of a short-lived polity, the United Belgian States.

The revolution was the product of opposition which emerged to the liberal reforms of Emperor Joseph II in the 1780s. These were perceived as an attack on the Catholic Church and the traditional institutions in the Austrian Netherlands. Resistance, focused in the autonomous and wealthy Estates of Brabant and Flanders, grew. In the aftermath of rioting and disruption in 1787, known as the Small Revolution, many dissidents took refuge in the neighboring Dutch Republic where they formed a rebel army. Soon after the outbreak of the French and Liège revolutions, this émigré army crossed into the Austrian Netherlands and decisively defeated the Austrians at the Battle of Turnhout in October 1789. The rebels, supported by uprisings across the territory, soon took control over virtually all the Southern Netherlands and proclaimed independence. Despite the tacit support of Prussia, the independent United Belgian States, established in January 1790, received no foreign recognition and the rebels soon became divided along ideological lines. The Vonckists, led by Jan Frans Vonck, advocated progressive and liberal government, whereas the Statists, led by Henri Van der Noot, were staunchly conservative and supported by the Church. The Statists, who had a wider base of support, soon drove the Vonckists into exile through a terror.

By mid-1790, Habsburg Austria had ended its war with the Ottoman Empire and prepared to suppress the Brabant revolutionaries. The new Holy Roman Emperor, Leopold II, a liberal like his predecessor, proposed an amnesty for the rebels. After a Statist army was overcome at the Battle of Falmagne, the territory was quickly overrun by Imperial forces, and the revolution was defeated by December. The Austrian reestablishment was short-lived, however, and the territory was soon overrun by the French during the French Revolutionary Wars.

Because of its distinctive course, the Brabant Revolution had been extensively used in historical comparisons with the French Revolution. Some historians, following Henri Pirenne, have seen it as a key moment in the formation of a Belgian nation-state, and an influence on the Belgian Revolution of 1830.

== Background and causes ==
=== Austrian rule ===
Map of the Austrian Netherlands in the 1780s. The territory was not contiguous and was bisected by the Prince-Bishopric of Liège and tiny Duchy of Bouillon

The Austrian Netherlands was a territory with its capital at Brussels which covered much of what is today Belgium and Luxembourg during the Early Modern period. In 1714, the territory, which had been ruled by Spain, was ceded to Austria as part of the Treaty of Rastatt which ended the War of the Spanish Succession. In the 1580s, the Dutch Revolt had separated the independent Dutch Republic from the rest of the territory, leaving the Austrian Netherlands with a staunchly Catholic population. The clergy maintained substantial power.

The Austrian Netherlands were both a province of Habsburg Austria and a part of the Holy Roman Empire. In 1764, Joseph II, was elected as Holy Roman Emperor, ruling over a loosely unified federation of autonomous territories within Central Europe roughly equivalent to modern-day Belgium, Germany, Slovenia the Czech Republic and Austria. Joseph's mother, Maria Theresa, had appointed her favourite daughter, Maria Christina, and her husband, Albert Casimir, as joint Governors of the Austrian Netherlands in 1780. Both Joseph and Maria Theresa were considered reformists and were particularly interested in the idea of enlightened absolutism. Joseph II, who was known as the philosopher-emperor (empereur philosophe), had a particular interest in Enlightenment thought and had his own ideology which has sometimes been termed "Josephinism" after him. Joseph particularly disliked institutions which he considered "outdated", such as the established ultramontane Church whose allegiance to the papacy prevented the Emperor from having total control, which restricted efficient and centralist rule. Soon after taking power, in 1781, Joseph launched a low-key tour of inspection of the Austrian Netherlands during which he concluded reform in the territory was badly needed.

Politically, the Austrian Netherlands comprised a number of federated and autonomous territories, inherited from the Spanish, which could trace their lineage to the Middle Ages. These territories, known collectively as the Provincial States, retained much of their traditional power over their own internal affairs. The states were dominated by the wealthy and prominent Estates of Brabant and Flanders. The Austrian Governors-General were forced to respect the autonomy of the provincial states and could only act with some degree of consent. Within the states themselves, the "traditional" independence was considered extremely important and figures such as Jan-Baptist Verlooy had even begun to claim the linguistic unity of Flemish dialects as a sign of national identity in what is now Flanders.

=== Reforms of Joseph II ===
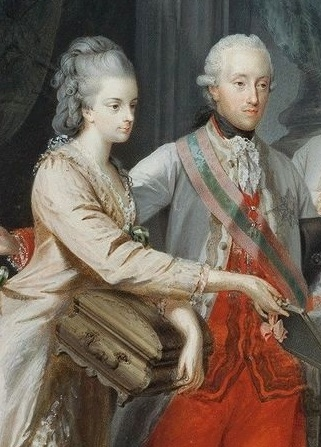
Maria Christina and Albert Casimir of Teschen, joint Governors-General of the Austrian Netherlands from 1780 to 1793

Propelled by his belief in the Enlightenment, soon after taking power, Joseph launched a number of reforms which he hoped would make the territories he controlled more efficient and easier to govern. From 1784, Joseph launched a number of "radical and wide-ranging" reforms in the fields of economics, politics and religion aimed at institutions which he judged outdated. Some have drawn parallels between Joseph's rule in the Holy Roman Empire and that of Philip II in the Netherlands as both attempted to suborn local traditions in order to achieve more effective central rule. Like Philip, Joseph's perceived attacks on important institutions succeeded in uniting multiple divergent social classes against him.

His initial reforms were aimed at the Catholic church which, because of its allegiance to the Vatican, was viewed a potentially subversive force. Joseph's first act was the proclamation of the Edict of Tolerance of 1781–82 which abolished the privileges which Catholics enjoyed over other Christian and non-Christian minorities. As an attack on the place of the church, it was deeply unpopular among Catholics, but because the non-Catholics were a tiny minority, it did not win any real support. The Edict was condemned by Cardinal Frankenberg who insisted that religious tolerance, the relaxation of censorship and the suppression of laws against the Jansenists all constituted an attack on the Catholic Church. Later, 162 monasteries whose inhabitants led a purely contemplative life were abolished. In September 1784, marriage was made a civil, rather than a religious, institution. This sharply reduced the church's traditional influence and power in its parishioners' family lives. Following this, in October 1786, the government abolished all seminaries in the territory to establish a single, state-run General Seminary (seminarium generale) in Leuven. Within the General Seminary, training would be in liberal and state-approved theology which was opposed by the upper ranks of the clergy.

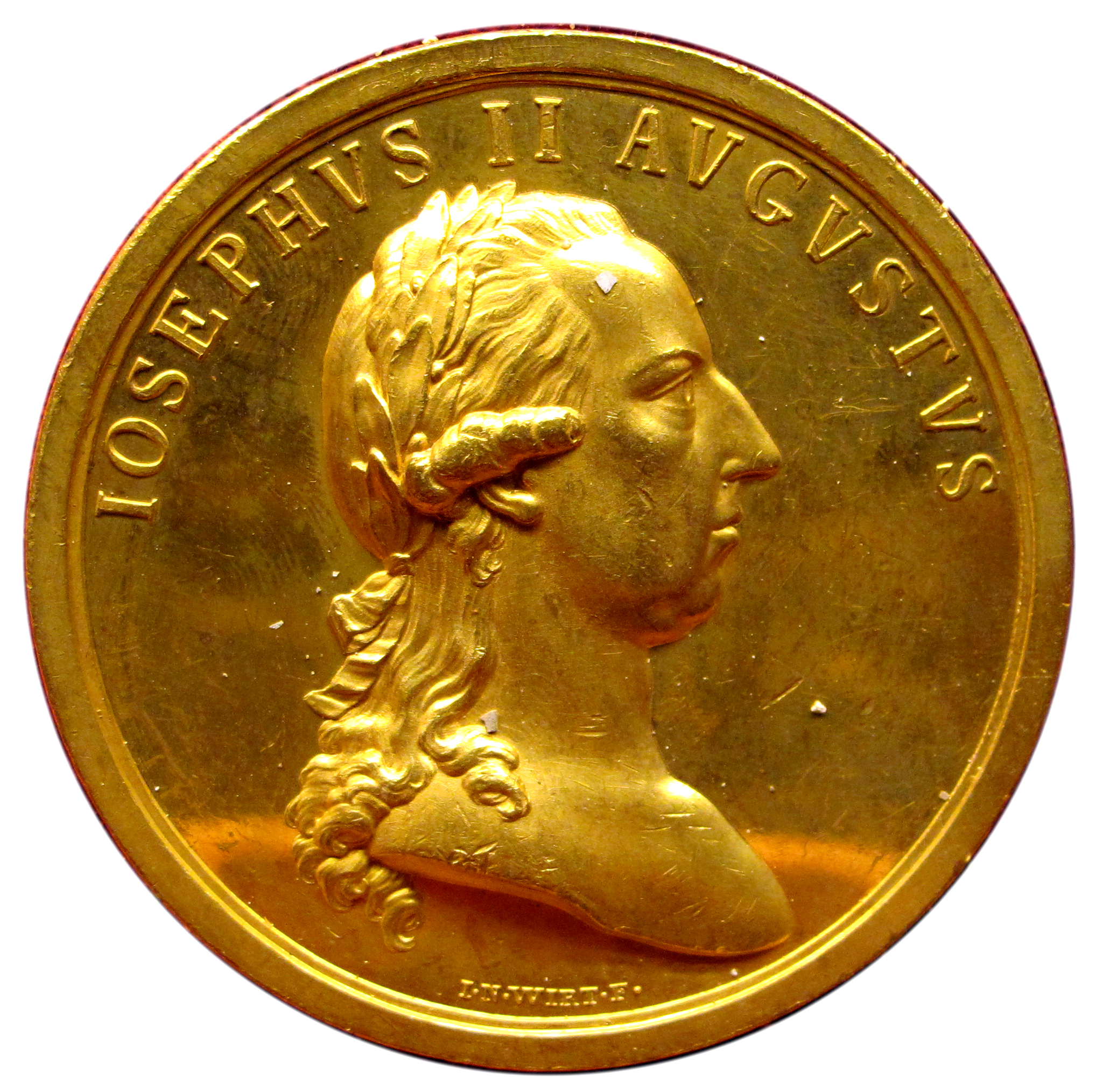
Gold medallion depicting Emperor Joseph II whose reforms sparked the revolt

In December 1786, he followed up his belief in liberalisation and earlier attacks on guild privileges by removing all tariffs on grain trade, but this was revoked in the economic slump that soon followed. Replaced local charity or poor-relief organisations with a single, central Brotherhood of Active Charity in April 1786. Schools were reformed.

Above all, however, Joseph attempted to break up the structure of autonomous states which provided the framework for the Austrian Netherlands. He introduced two reforms in early 1787 instituting new administrative and judicial reform to create a much more centralised system. The first decree abolished many of the administrative structures which had existed since the rule of Emperor Charles V (1500–58) and replaced them by a single General Council of Government under a minister-plenipotentiary. In addition, nine administrative circles (cercles), each controlled by an Intendant, were created to which much of the power of the states was devolved. A second decree abolished the ad hoc semi-feudal or ecclesiastical courts operated by the states and replaced them with a centralised system similar to that already in place in Austria. A single Sovereign Council of Justice was established in Brussels, with two appeal courts in Brussels and Luxembourg, and around 40 local district courts.

By threatening the independence of the states, the interests of the nobility and the position of the church, the reforms acted as a force to unite these groups against the Austrian government.

=== Opposition and the Small Revolution ===
The patriots chose the colours of Brabant (red, yellow and black) for their cockade. This would later influence the Belgian flag created in 1830.

Joseph's reforms were deeply unpopular within the Austrian Netherlands. The Enlightenment had made few inroads into the territory, and it was widely distrusted as a foreign phenomenon which was not compatible with traditional local values. The majority of the population, especially influenced by the Church, believed the reforms to be a threat to their own cultures and traditions which would leave them worse off. Even in pro-Enlightenment circles, the reforms caused discontent which were seen as not sufficiently radical and not far reaching enough. Popular opposition was centered on the provincial states, in particular Hainaut, Brabant and Flanders, as well as their law courts. There was a wave of critical pamphleting. In some towns, riots broke out and the militia had to be called to suppress them. The Estate of Brabant called a lawyer, Henri Van der Noot, to defend their position publicly. Van der Noot publicly accused the reforms of violating the precedents established by the Joyous Entry of 1356 which was widely regarded as a traditional bill of rights for the region.

Discontent crystallised into a wave of uprisings and rioting known as the Small Revolution (Kleine Revolutie) of 1787. The revolution was suppressed by levying the civil militias but it alarmed the Governors-General and opposition grew. The Small Revolution proved that the Austrian army was insufficient on its own to keep order without some popular support. The allegiance of the civil militias, who were already beginning to call themselves Patriots (Patriotten), was uncertain. Fearing for the security of the regime, the Governors-General temporarily suspended the reforms without the Emperor's permission on 20 May 1787. They invited all aggrieved parties to express their opposition and grievances in petitions but this merely inflamed the regime's critics. The Emperor himself was furious and recalled his minister, Ludovico, Conte di Belgiojoso. Alarmed by the level of unrest, Joseph eventually agreed to repeal his reforms to the judicial system and governance but left his clerical reforms in place. He hoped that, by removing the grievances of the states and middle classes, the opposition would become divided and would be easily suppressed. He also appointed a new Minister Plenipotentiary to oversee the province. The concession did not stop the opposition growing, inspired and funded by the Catholic clergy, which became especially notable at the University of Leuven.

Between 1788 and 1789, the Minister-Plenipotentiary of the Austrian Netherlands decided that the only way in which reform could be provoked would be by rapid and uncompromising enforcement. Some states had already begun to refuse payment of taxes to the Austrian authorities. The Joyous Entry was officially annulled and the Estates of Hainaut and Brabant were disbanded.

=== Growth of organised resistance and the émigrés ===
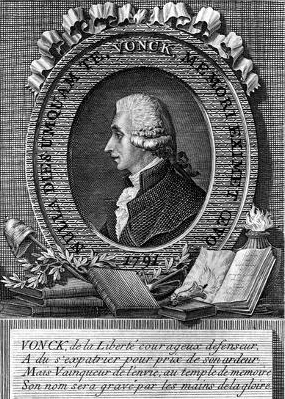
Portrait of Jan Frans Vonck, who led the liberal resistance to the Austrians

In the aftermath of the suppression of the Small Revolution, opposition began to consolidate into more organised resistance. Fearing for his safety, Van der Noot, the organiser of the disruption of 1787, went into exile in the Dutch Republic where he tried to lobby support from William V. Van der Noot attempted to persuade William to support the overthrow of the Austrian regime and install his son, Frederick, as Stadtholder of a Belgian republic. However, William was suspicious and expressed little interest in Van der Noot's proposal. None of the political factions in Dutch society proclaimed support for similar proposal. Nevertheless, Van der Noot was able to set up a headquarters in the city of Breda, near the Dutch-Belgian border, where an émigré faction grew. The Dutch population also remained broadly sympathetic towards the patriots. As disquiet in the Austrian Netherlands grew, thousands of Flemish and Brabant dissidents fled into the Dutch Republic to join the growing patriot army at Breda although the force remained relatively small.

Inside the Austrian Netherlands themselves, the lawyers Jan Frans Vonck and Verlooy formed a secret society called Pro Aris et Focis (Note: Pro Aris et Focis was a Latin phrase literally meaning "For our altars and hearths", sometimes rendered into "For God and Country", and refers to a quote by the Roman orator and statesman Cicero in his work De Natura Deorum (3.40).) in April or May 1789 in order to plan for an armed uprising against Austrian rule. Weapons and revolutionary tracts were distributed. Most of the members of the organisation came from the liberal professions (such as lawyers, writers and merchants). Most were moderates who did not object to Joseph II's reforms in principle but because they had been levied on the territories without consultation. They were supported financially by the clergy. Initially members of the opposition were divided on how the uprising should occur. Unlike Van der Noot, Vonck believed that Belgium should liberate itself rather than rely on foreign aid.

With the support of the Belgian clergy, all the opposition factions (including Van der Noot) agreed to unite and a Brabant Patriot Committee (Brabants patriottisch Comité) was formed in Hasselt. On 30 August, Pro Aris et Focis voted to install Jean-André van der Mersch (or Vandermersch), a retired military officer, as the commander of the émigré army in Breda. The Committee agreed that the rebellion should begin in October 1789.

== Revolution ==
In the spring of 1789, a revolution broke out in France against the Bourbon regime of King Louis XVI. In August 1789, the inhabitants of the Prince-Bishopric of Liège also overthrew their tyrannical Prince-Bishop, César-Constantin-François de Hoensbroeck, in a bloodless coup d'état known as the "Happy Revolution" (Heureuse révolution). Contemporaries viewed the uprising in Liège, which was also inspired by Enlightenment ideas, as a symptom of revolutionary "contagion" from France. In the face of a rebellion proclaiming the ideas of liberty and equality, the Prince-Bishop soon fled to the neighboring Archbishopric of Trier and the revolutionaries proclaimed a republic in Liège.

=== Invasion ===
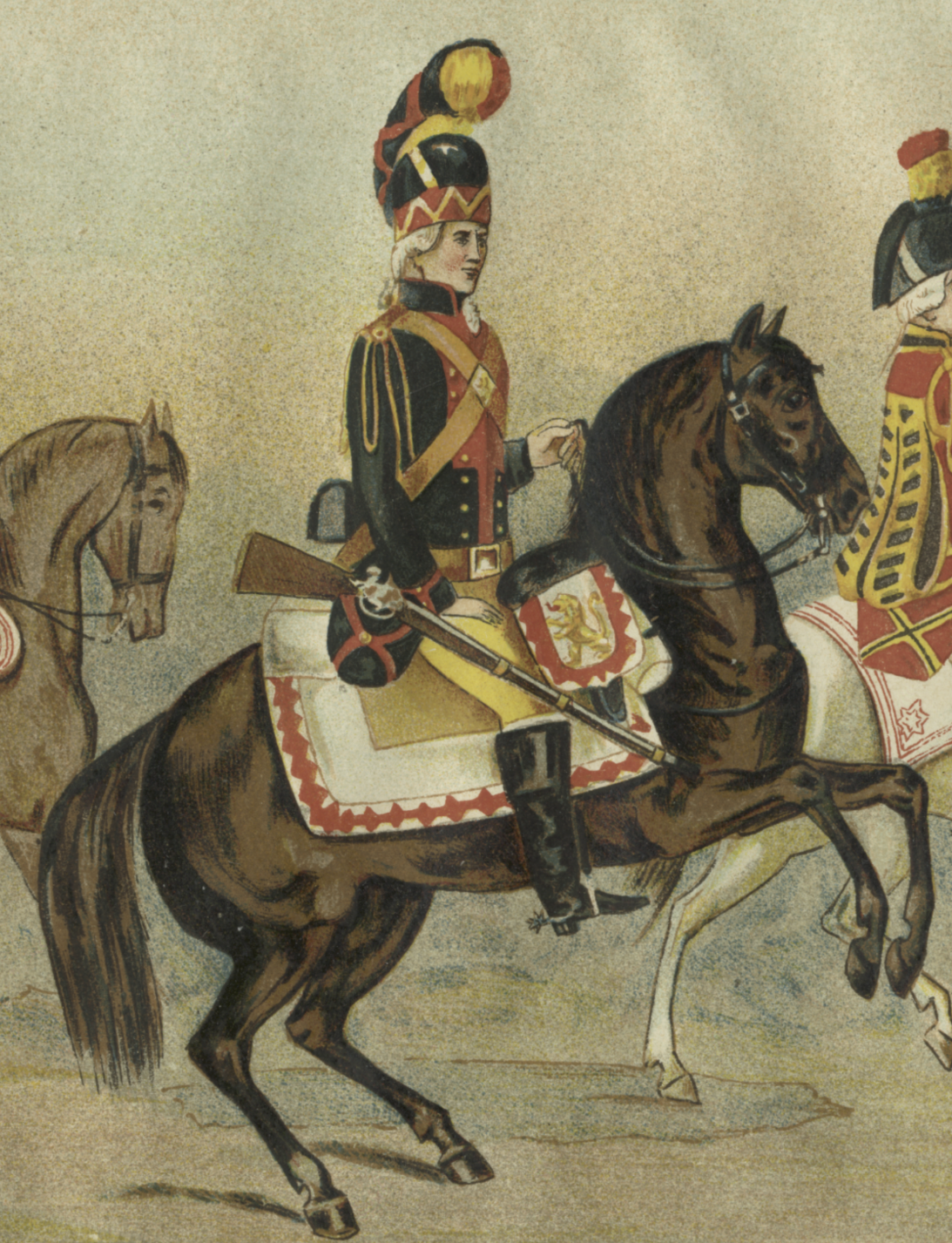
A rebel cavalryman

The Brabant Revolution broke out on 24 October 1789 when the émigré patriot army under Van der Mersch crossed over the Dutch border into the Austrian Netherlands. The army, which numbered 2,800 men, crossed into the Kempen region south of Breda. The army arrived in the town of Hoogstraten where a specially prepared document, the Manifesto of the People of Brabant (Manifeste du peuple brabançon), was read in the city hall. The document denounced Joseph II's rule and declared that he no longer held legitimacy. The text of the speech itself was an embellished version of the 1581 declaration (the Verlatinge) by the Dutch States-General denouncing Philip II's rule in the Netherlands.

On 27 October, the patriot army clashed with a much-larger Austrian force at the nearby town of Turnhout. The ensuing battle was a triumph for the outnumbered rebels and the Austrians suffered a "shameful defeat". The rebel triumph broke the back of the Austrian forces in Belgium and many local soldiers within the Austrian force deserted to the patriot cause. Swelled by new recruits and supported by the population, the patriot army advanced rapidly into Flanders. On 16 November, Flander's major city, Ghent, was taken after four days of fighting and the Estate of Flanders proclaimed support for the rebel cause. The rebel armies penetrated further into the territory, defeating Austrian forces in a number of small skirmishes, and captured the town of Mons on 21 November. By December, the Austrian force, fully routed, withdrew to the fortified city of Luxembourg in the south, abandoning the rest of the territory to the patriots.

Historians have pointed to the deliberate parallels between the entrance of the rebel army into the Austrian Netherlands in 1789 and Louis of Nassau's invasion of Frisia in 1566 which acted as the trigger for the Dutch Revolt against Spanish rule.

=== United Belgian States ===
With fall of the Austrian regime, the revolutionaries were forced to decide what form a new revolutionary state would take. Figures within revolutionary France, such as Jacques Pierre Brissot, praised their work and encouraged them to declare their own national independence in the spirit of the American Revolution. On 30 November, a Declaration of Unity was signed between Flanders and the Brabant states. On 20 December, an actual declaration of independence was signed proclaiming the end of Austrian rule and the independence of the states.

"The happy revolution which we have just brought to a glorious conclusion under the visible auspices of God has placed the supreme power in our hands. By virtue of this power we have declared ourselves to be free and independent and have deprived and dismissed the former duke, Joseph II, from all sovereignty..."

— Declaration of Independence, 20 December 1789.

After the rebel capture of Brussels on 18 December, work soon began on a new constitution. In January, the rebels re-called the States-General, a traditional assembly composed of the provincial elites which had not met since the Middle Ages, to discuss the form the new state would take. Its 53 members, representing the states and social classes, met in Brussels in January 1790 to begin negotiations. The constitution eventually devised by the States-General was inspired by both the Dutch Verlatinge of 1581 and American Declaration of Independence of 1776. The liberals were disgusted that members of society from beyond the guilds, clergy and nobility should not be consulted. They also saw the closed sessions of the States-General as ridiculing the idea of popular sovereignty. The declaration of the independence was not supported by Britain and the Dutch who believed that the new independent state would not be able to act as an effective buffer against possible French territorial expansion in the region.

On 11 January 1790, the United Belgian States (État-Belgiques-Unis or Verenigde Nederlandse Staten) was officially formed with a Treaty of Union. After negotiations, the delegates decided that the states should be unified into a single polity. A Sovereign Congress was created in Brussels which would act as a parliament for the whole union. Autonomy over almost all important matters, however, was still decided independently by the states themselves.

=== Growing divisions and factionalism ===
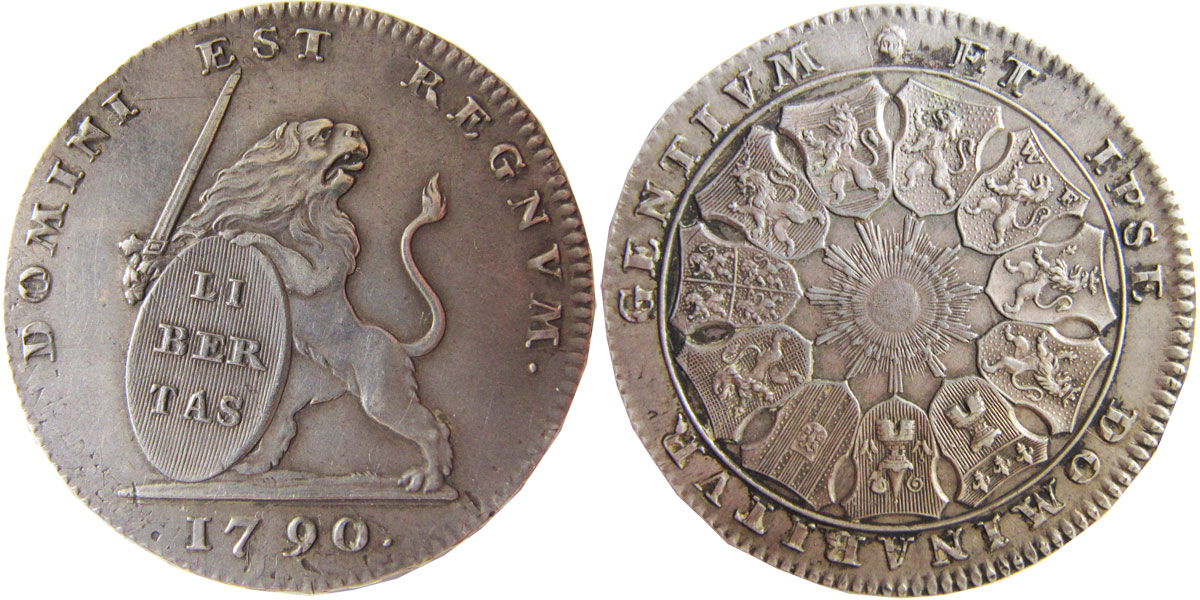
A coin, known as a Silver Lion (Lion d'Argent), minted by the rebels in 1790

Soon after its establishment, the politics of the United Belgian States became polarised between two opposing factions. The first faction, known as the Vonckists after their leader Vonck, was a "more or less liberal reform party" which believed the revolution represented the triumph of popular sovereignty. They derived much of their support from the liberal middle classes and hoped that the revolution would allow their supporters to achieve political power traditionally monopolised by the clergy and aristocracy. Most had not disagreed with Joseph's reforms in principle, but believed that the way in which they had been implemented was arbitrary and showed disregard for his subjects. Traditionally, much of the Vonckists' support was based in Flanders which was considered more liberal than Brabant.

Opposed to the Vonckists were the more conservative Statists (sometimes also known as "Aristocrats"), led by Van der Noot. The Statists had a broader base of support than the Vonckists and were particularly supported by the clergy, lower classes, nobility and the feudal corporations. The Statists viewed the revolution as a purely reactive measure to reforms which they considered unacceptable. Most Statists supported the maintenance of traditional aristocratic privilege and the position of the Church.

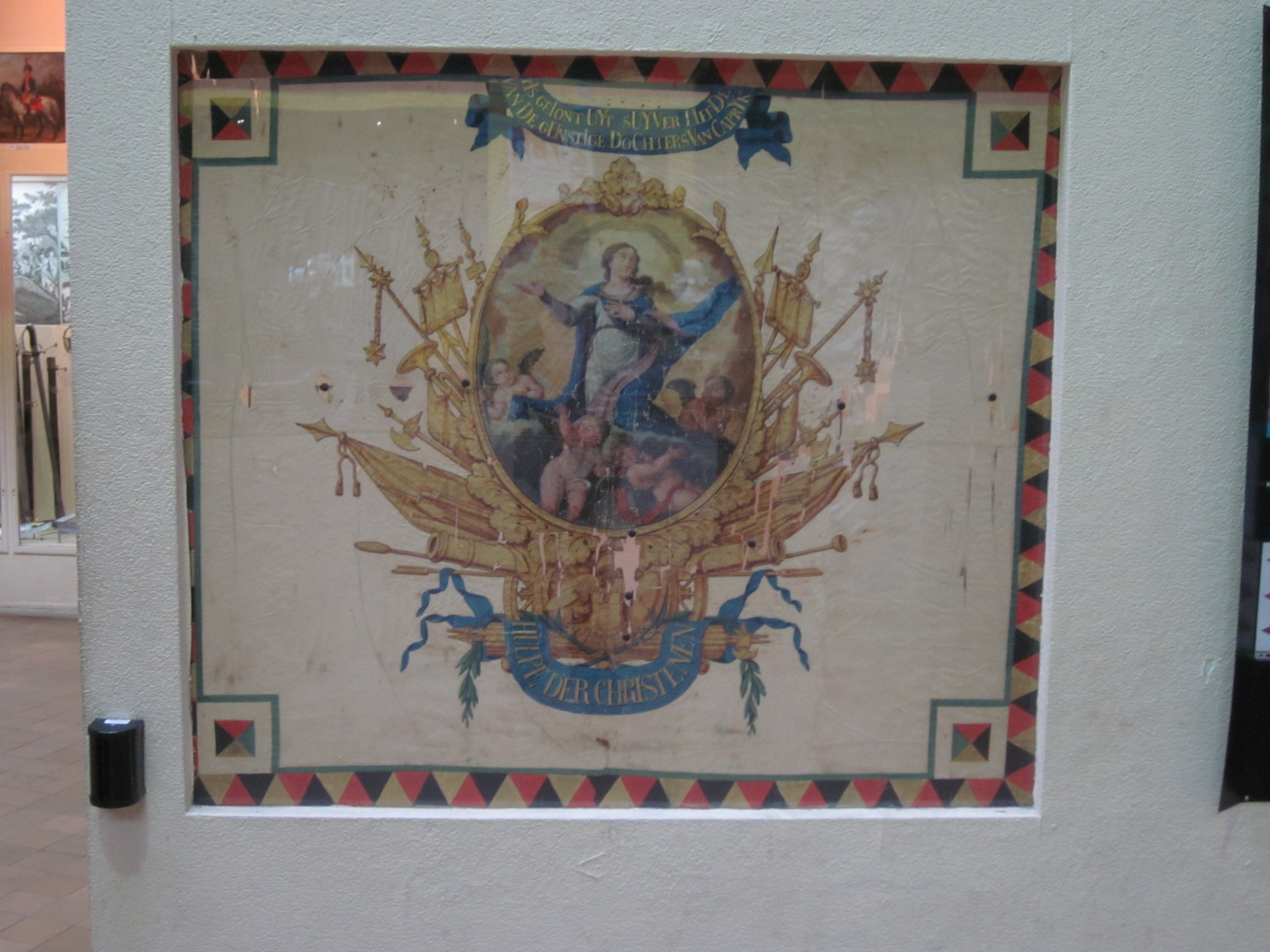
An original Statist military flag, depicting the Virgin Mary, preserved in the Royal Museum of the Army

The two factions soon clashed over the composition of the provincial assemblies which was "a conflict of which no peaceful solution existed" in the constitution. The Statists accused the Vonckists of sharing the same views as the radicals of the French Revolution. The Statists succeeded in gaining support in a number of Patriotic Associations (Patriottische Maatschappij), similar to the "clubs" of Revolutionary France, which were composed of members of the wealthy classes. By March 1790, the Vonckists had been forced out of Brussels by a mob. An armed "crusade" of peasants, carrying crucifixes and led by priests, marched on Brussels in June to confirm their support of the Statists and to display rejection of the Enlightenment. Influenced by the growing power of the radicals in France, the mob believed that the Vonckists were anti-clerical although this was probably untrue.

With the support of the population, Van der Noot launched a persecution of Vonckists known as the Statist Terror (Statistisch Schrikbewind). Verlooy and Vandermersh were arrested and imprisoned. Vonck and his remaining supporters forced into exile in Lille where they tried to raise opposition to the Statists but in vain. Faced with an increasingly reactionary government in the United Belgian States, many of the exiled Vonckists felt that they had more to gain from negotiating with the Austrians than with the Statists. Amid rumours of Austrian military forces nearing Belgium, the Statists put their faith in a foreign military intervention and began lobbying the Prussians, who were believed to be sympathetic, for support.

=== Suppression ===
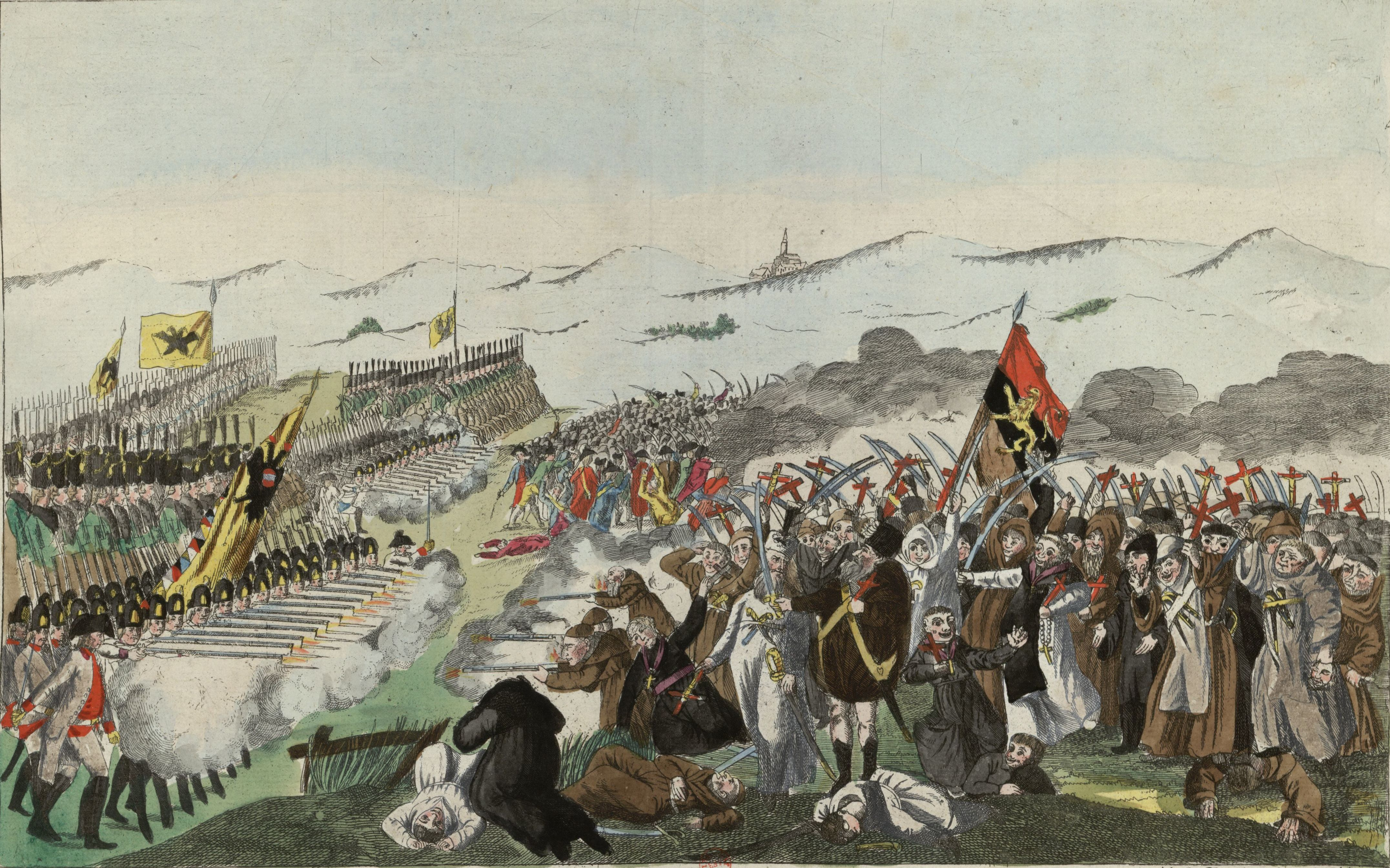
The Battle of Falmagne of September 1790 was one of the few battles fought between Austrian and Statist forces

Just months after its proclamation, in December 1789, the Liège Republic was condemned by the Austrians, and was occupied by troops from neighbouring Prussia. Disagreements between the Prussians and the Prince-Bishop about the form a restoration would take led to a Prussian withdrawal and the revolutionaries soon took power again.

Initially, the Brabant Revolution was also able to continue unthreatened because of the lack of external opposition. Soon after the revolution started, Joseph II had fallen ill. Following its defeats at the hands of the patriot army in the initial campaign, the only Austrian force in the region, taking refuge in Luxembourg, could not challenge the rebels alone. The ongoing conflict with the Ottoman Empire also meant that the bulk of Austria's own army could not be spared to put down the rebellion.

Realising that foreign support would be necessary for the continued existence of the United Belgian States, the Statists tried to make contact with foreign powers they believed to be sympathetic. Despite numerous attempts, however, the revolution failed to gain foreign support. The Dutch were not interested and, although the Prussian king, Frederick William II, was sympathetic and did send some troops to aid the revolutionaries in July, Prussia was also forced to withdraw its forces under combined Austrian and British pressure.

Joseph died in February 1790 and was soon succeeded by his brother Leopold II. Leopold, himself a confirmed liberal, made an armistice with the Turks and withdrew 30,000 troops to repress the rebellion in Brabant. On 27 July 1790, Leopold signed the Reichenbach Convention with Prussia which allowed the Emperor to begin the reconquest of the Austrian Netherlands as long as its local traditions were respected. An amnesty was offered to all revolutionaries who surrendered to the Austrian forces.

The Austrian army, under Field Marshal Blasius Columban, Baron von Bender, invaded in the United Belgian States and encountered little resistance from the population which was already discontented with the governance and infighting of the rebels. The Austrians defeated the Statist army at the Battle of Falmagne on 28 September. Hainaut was the first to recognise Leopold's sovereignty and other cities soon followed. Namur was captured on 24 November. The Sovereign Congress met for the final time on 27 November before disbanding itself. On 3 December, the Austrians accepted the surrender of Brussels and reoccupied the city, effectively marking the suppression of the revolution.

== Aftermath ==
In the aftermath of the defeat of the United Belgian States, a convention was held at The Hague on 10 December 1790 to decide what form the Austrian reestablishment would take. The convention, which included representatives of the Emperor and the Triple Alliance of the Dutch, British and Prussians, eventually decided to cancel most of Joseph II's reforms. Despite the Austrian reestablishment, anti-government pamphleting continued. The Dutch radical Gerrit Paape published his detailed observations on the uprising and observed that a new revolution was needed in which the "happiness and freedom of peoples" were respected. The Liège Revolution was also finally suppressed by Austrian forces in January 1791 and its Prince-Bishop reinstated.

=== French invasion ===
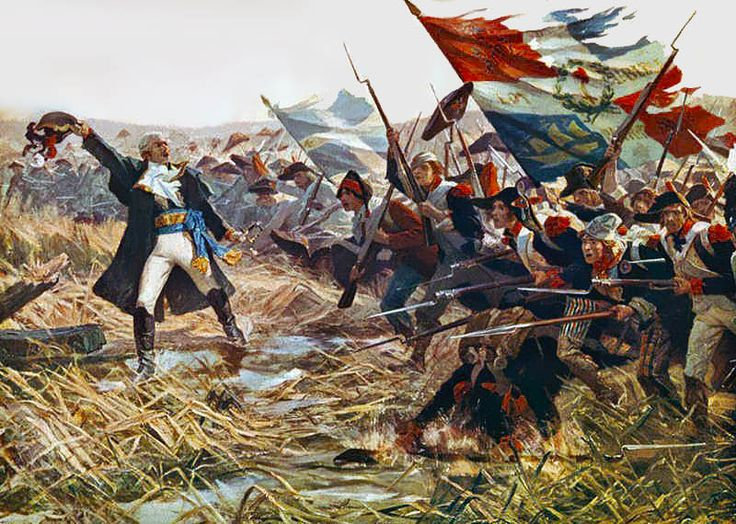
The advance of the French revolutionary army at the Battle of Jemappes in 1792

The exiled Vonckists in France embraced the French invasion of the territory as the only way to implement their own objectives, largely forgetting the nationalist dimension of their original ideologies. After the two Belgian revolutions were crushed, a number of Brabant and Liège revolutionaries regrouped in Paris, where they formed the joint Committee of United Belgians and Liégeois (Comité des belges et liégeois unis), which united revolutionaries from both territories for the first time. Three Belgian corps and a Liège Legion were levied to continue the fight for the French against the Austrians.

The War of the First Coalition (1792–1797) was the first major effort of multiple European monarchies to defeat Revolutionary France. France declared war on Austria in April 1792, and the Kingdom of Prussia joined the Austrian side a few weeks later. France was attacked by Prussian and Holy Roman forces from the Austrian Netherlands. Though the French defeated the Austrian army in the Battle of Jemappes in 1792 and briefly occupied the Austrian Netherlands and Liège, they were pushed out by an Austrian counterattack in the Battle of Neerwinden the following year. In June 1794, French revolutionary troops expelled Holy Roman forces from the region for the last time after the Battle of Fleurus. The French government voted to formally annex the territory in October 1795 and it was split into nine provincial départements within France. French rule in the region, known as the French period (Franse tijd or période française), was marked by the rapid implementation and extension of numerous reforms which had been passed in post-Revolution France since 1789. Administration was organised under the French model, with meritocratic selection. Legal equality and state secularism were also introduced.

=== Legacy ===
After the defeat of the French in the Napoleonic Wars in 1815, Belgium came under Dutch rule. The Belgian Revolution, which broke out on 25 August 1830 after the performance of a nationalist opera in Brussels led to a minor insurrection among the capital's bourgeoisie, was inspired to some extent by the Brabant Revolution. The day after the revolution broke out, revolutionaries began flying their own flag, clearly influenced by the colours chosen by the Brabant Revolution of 1789. The colours (red, yellow and black) today form the national flag of Belgium. Some historians have also argued that the Vonckists and Statists were the forerunners of the major political factions, the Liberals and the Catholics, which would dominate Belgian politics after independence.

== Historical analysis ==
"Much in these revolutionary activities [in Brabant] brings to mind the Patriot troubles in the Dutch Republic. As in the North, this nationalism was ... based on a profound feeling of nostalgia ... and closely related to a profound feeling of humiliation."

— E. H. Kossmann (1978).

The Brabant Revolution has been extensively used for historical comparisons with other revolutions of the time. The leading Belgian historian, Henri Pirenne, contrasted the Brabant Revolution, which he termed "defensive" or "conservative", with the more enlightened uprisings in France and Liège in his Histoire de Belgique series. Other historians have agreed, commenting that the Brabant revolutionaries had an ideology which was deliberately opposed to the Enlightened and Democratic vision of the French Revolutionaries. The historians Jacques Godechot and Robert Roswell Palmer characterised the ideology of the French revolutionaries as founded on beliefs in the "enlightenment" and "national consciousness". Palmer argued for similarities between the Brabant Revolution and the counter-revolutionary activities of pre-revolutionary institutions, like the guilds and the aristocracy, in France which were ultimately defeated and abolished. Some historians have similarly drawn parallels between the Brabant Revolution and the French counter-revolutions in the Vendée. Other historians, like E. H. Kossmann, have noted similarities between the uprising and the Dutch Revolt. It has also been argued that the Brabant Revolution might form part of the same Europe-wide "crisis of the ancien régime" which sparked the French Revolution.

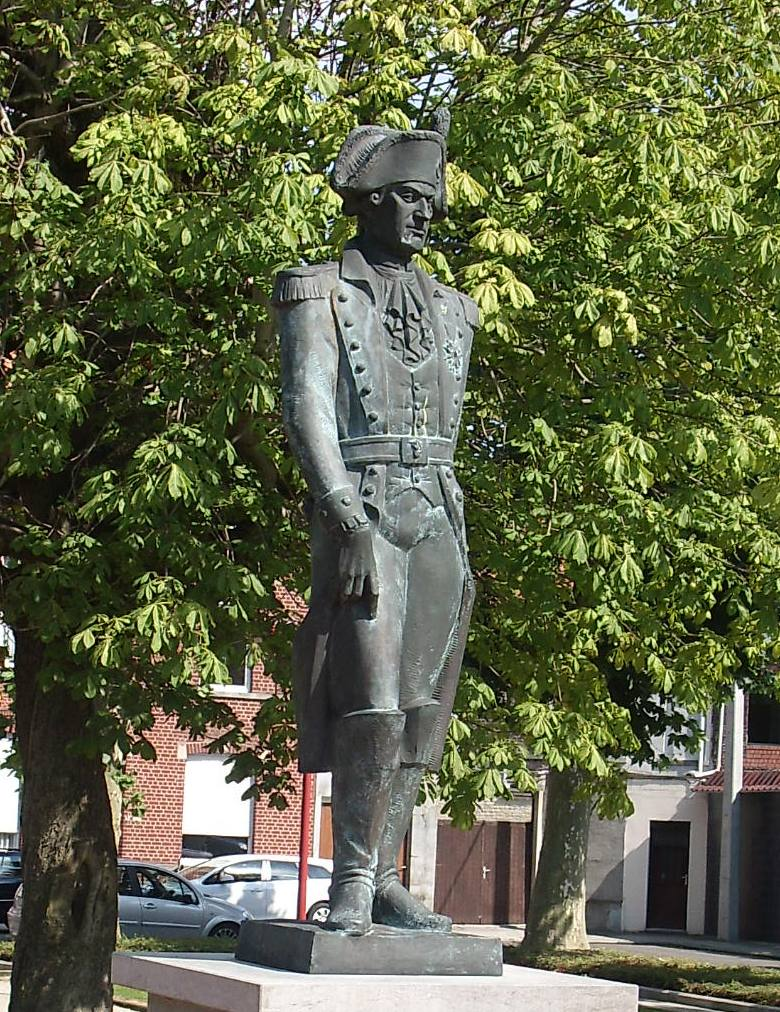
Statue of Van der Mersch in the Belgian city of Menen

Pirenne, a nationalist himself, argued that the Brabant Revolution was a very important influence on the Belgian Revolution of 1830 and can be seen as an early expression of Belgian nationalism. Pirenne praised the revolution as a unification of Flemish and Walloons. He also argued that the Vonckists and Statists could be seen as the forerunners of the major political factions of Belgium post-independence, the Liberals and Catholics, and expressed sympathy with the Vonckists. Pirenne, as a liberal, could only explain the defeat of the Vonckists by playing up the economic and social backwardness of the Austrian Netherlands. He supported this viewpoint by emphasizing the disgust seen in traveler's tales written by "enlightened" German observers. This has been criticised by modern historians, like J. Craeybeckx, who argue that France was no more socially or economically advanced than the Austrian Netherlands at the time.

Conceptually, the Brabant Revolution has generally been seen as a "revolution from above", based on the defense of existing privileges and the upper classes and clergy rather than the proletariat. Kossmann argued that, while it was Vonck who began the revolution, it was Van der Noot who was best able to shape it. In his belief, this was because Vonck was able to rally mass support against the Austrians, but not in support of his own policies unlike Van der Noot. It has also been argued that the revolution's ideology was framed in direct opposition to the democratic and liberal revolutions in France, Switzerland, the Netherlands and the German states.

== See also ==
- Patriottentijd (c.1780–87) – contemporary political unrest in the Dutch Republic
- Peasants' War (1798)
- Belgium in the long nineteenth century
- List of revolutions and rebellions

== Notes and references ==
=== Bibliography ===
- Cook, Bernard A. (2004). Belgium: A History. Studies in Modern European History (3rd ed.). New York: Peter Lang. ISBN 978-0-8204-7647-6.
- Craeybeckx, J. (1970). "The Brabant Revolution: A Conservative Revolt in a Backwards Country?". Acta Historiae Neerlandica: Historical Studies in the Netherlands. 4: 49–84.
- Galloy, Denise; Hayt, Franz (2006). La Belgique: des Tribus Gauloises à l'Etat Fédéral (in French) (5th ed.). Brussels: De Boeck. ISBN 978-2-8041-5098-3.
- Israel, Jonathan (2011). Democratic Enlightenment: Philosophy, Revolution, and Human Rights 1750–1790. Oxford: Oxford University Press. ISBN 9780199548200.
- Kossmann, E. H. (1978). The Low Countries, 1780–1940 (Repr. ed.). Oxford: Clarendon Press. ISBN 978-0-19-822108-1.
- Polasky, Janet (2005). "The Belgian Revolutions, 1786–1830". In Dénes, Iván Z. (ed.). Liberty and the Search for Identity: Liberal Nationalisms and the Legacy of Empires. Budapest: Central European University Press. pp. 75–88. ISBN 978-9637326448.
- Pirenne, Henri (1920). Histoire de Belgique. Vol. 5: La Fin du Régime Espagnol, Le Régime Autricien, La Révolution Brabançonne et la Révolution Liégeoise. Brussels: Henri Lamertin. OCLC 228793230.
- Roegiers, J.; Van Sas, N. C. F. (2006). "Revolution in the North and South, 1780–1830". In Blom, J. C. H. (ed.). History of the Low Countries (New ed.). New York: Berghahn Books. ISBN 978-1-84545-272-8.
- Rowen, Herbert H. (1972). The Low Countries in Early Modern Times. London: Macmillan. OCLC 528290.
- Vercruysse, Jeroom. "Chronologie van de Belgische Geschiedenis 1787–1794". Comité 1789. Archived from the original on 13 December 2014.
- Zolberg, Aristide R. (1974). "The Making of Flemings and Walloons: Belgium: 1830–1914". Journal of Interdisciplinary History. 5 (2): 179–235. doi:10.2307/202507. JSTOR 202507.

== Primary sources ==
- Lochée, Lewis, Observations sur la Révolution Belgique, et réflexions sur un certain imprimé adressé au Peuple Belgique, qui sert de justification au Baron de Schoenfeldt (in French) (1791, full text)
