= Edict on Idle Institutions =

1780 edict of the Holy Roman Emperor

The Edict on Idle Institutions was one of more than 10,000 ordinances issued by Joseph II, Holy Roman Emperor pertaining to religious issues. Promulgated in 1780, it outlawed contemplative monastic orders. The act permitted only monastic orders that dealt with teaching, nursing and other practical work within the Holy Roman Empire. The number of monks (whom the Emperor called "shaven-headed creatures whom the common people worship on bended knees") dropped from 65,000 to 27,000. The Holy Roman Empire also expropriated the monasteries and took their money to pay ordinary priests more.

The edict fits in with Joseph's ecclesiastical reforms, in which he sought to control the church in Austria and the Empire and saw it as an arm of the state.
