= United Belgian States =

18th-century republic in the Netherlands

United Belgian States: Verenigde Belgische Staten (Dutch); États-Belgiques-Unis (French)
- 1790
- The United Belgian States' territory in 1790
- Status: Unrecognized state Vassal state of Holy Roman Empire
- Capital: Brussels
- Government: Confederal republic
- President of the Sovereign Congress
  - 1790: François de Nélis
  - 1790: Henri de Crumpipen
- President of the National Congress
  - 1790: Henri Van der Noot
- Legislature: Sovereign Congress
- Historical era: Brabant Revolution
  - Manifesto of Brabant: 24 October 1789
  - Treaty of Union: 11 January 1790
  - Battle of Falmagne: 22 September 1790
  - Surrender of Brussels: 2 December 1790
- Currency: See Brabant Revolution coinage
| Preceded by | Succeeded by |
| Austrian Netherlands | Austrian Netherlands |
- Today part of: Belgium; Luxembourg

The United Belgian States (Dutch: Verenigde Nederlandse Staten or Verenigde Belgische Staten; French: États-Belgiques-Unis), also known as the United States of Belgium, was a short-lived confederal republic in the Southern Netherlands (modern-day Belgium) established under the Brabant Revolution. It existed from January to December 1790 as part of the unsuccessful revolt against the Habsburg Emperor, Joseph II.

The United Belgian States' area coincided between 1789 and 1790 with the western and central parts of present-day Belgium. Before that, it corresponded to the largest part of the Austrian Netherlands, that is to say, regions within the Holy Roman Empire ruled by the Austrian Habsburgs.

== Background ==
Influenced by the Enlightenment, Emperor Joseph II, who became sole ruler of the Habsburg lands after Maria Theresa's death in 1780, decreed a series of large-scale reforms in the Austrian Netherlands designed to radically modernize and centralize the political, judicial and administrative systems.

Characteristically, Joseph II abruptly imposed his reforms without even a semblance of consultation with the population, which actually included an influential urban intelligentsia and other segments of the ruling classes who were highly receptive to such innovations. The Emperor's edict of tolerance of 1781 established religious freedom. Another edict in 1784 removed from the Catholic clergy responsibility for the civil registry, and civil marriage was introduced. Under the Edict on Idle Institutions (1780), contemplative religious orders, deemed useless, were dissolved and diocesan seminaries were abolished and replaced by general seminaries in Leuven and Luxembourg. Feudal and trade corporation regulations and jurisdictions were modified or abolished, and the authorities abolished the ancient provinces of Flanders, Brabant, Hainaut, Namur, and Luxembourg, replacing them with 9 circles (German: Kreise), subdivided in 64 districts. Seigneurial jurisdictions and rights, including the corvée, were abolished. As in Hungary, Joseph II attempted to introduce German as the language of administration for the sake of efficiency.

== Politics ==
The United Belgian States was a confederal republic of eight provinces which had their own governments, were sovereign and independent, and were governed directly by the Sovereign Congress (French: Congrès souverain; Dutch: Soevereine Congres), the confederal government. The Sovereign Congress was seated in Brussels and consisted of representatives of each of the eight provinces. Henri Van der Noot served in the capacity of Head of government, retaining the title of minister plenipotentiary having previously held the title of minister plenipotentiary of Brabant (Ministre Plénipotentiaire du Brabant).

== Brabant Revolution ==
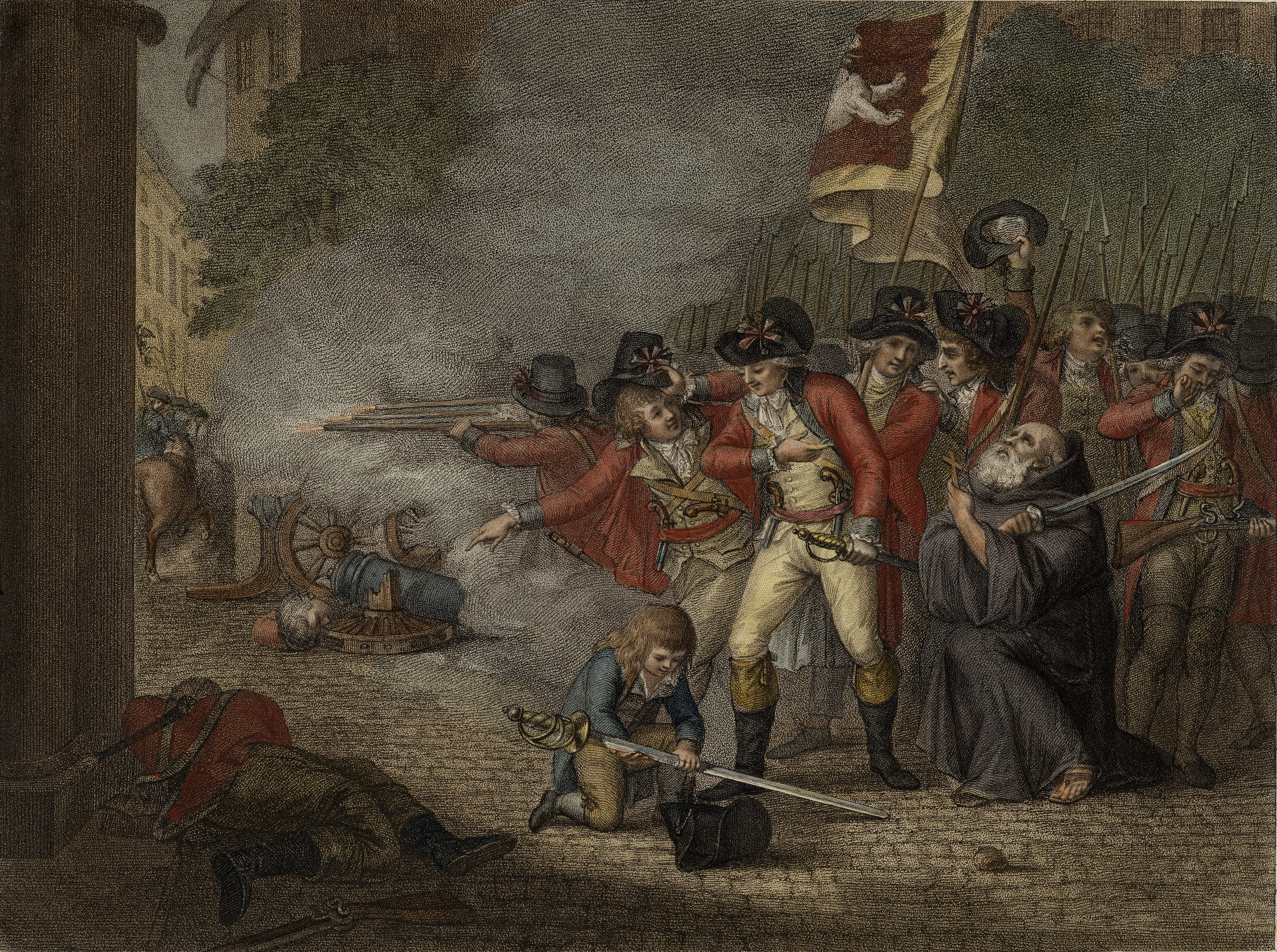
The Battle of Turnhout on 27 October 1789

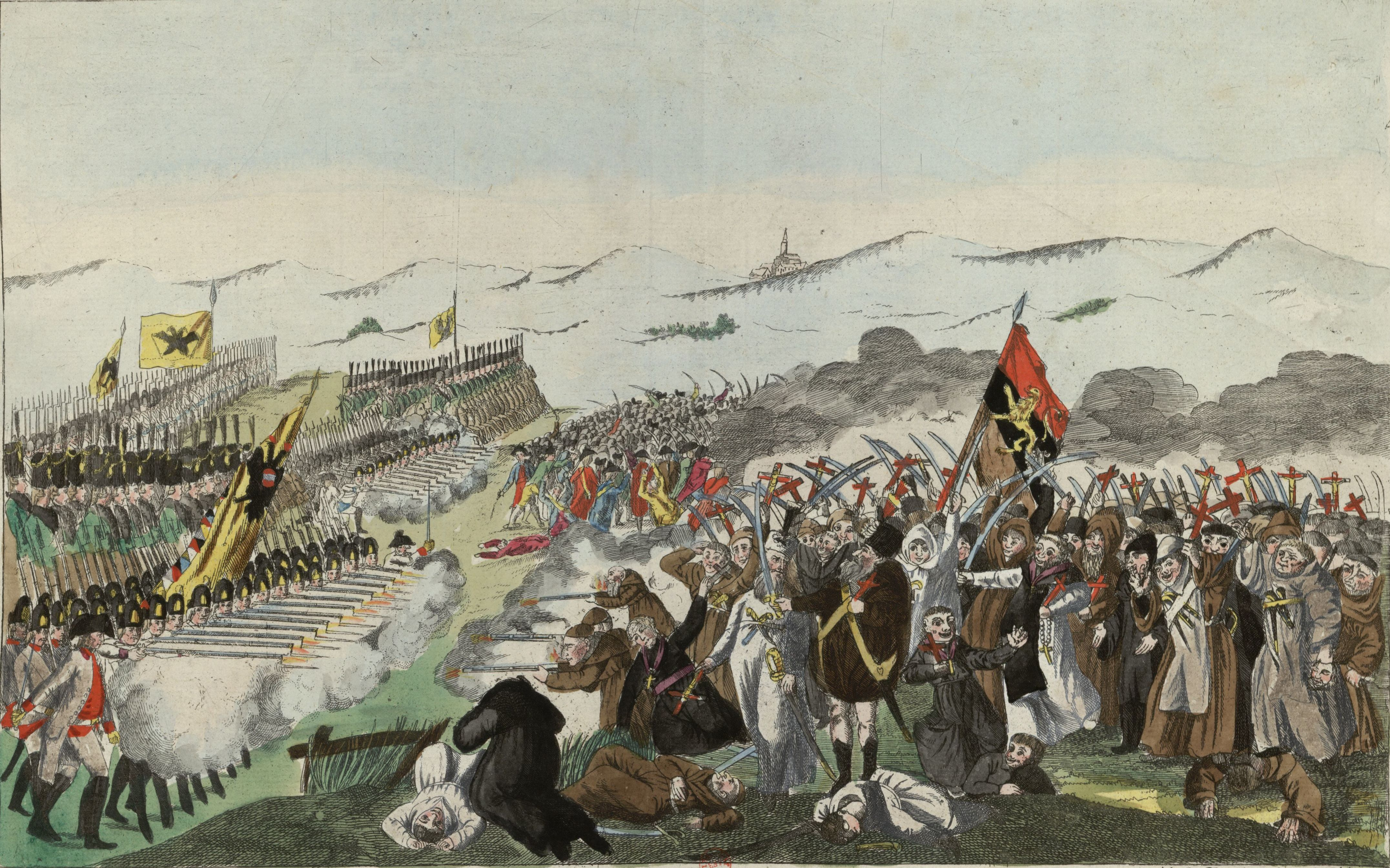
The Battle of Falmagne on 22 September 1790

History of the Low Countries (schematic)
| Frisii | | Germanic tribes | | Belgae & Celts | | | |
| Frisii | Cana– nefates (Note: Roman foederati) | Chamavi, Tubantes (Note: The Chamavi merged into the confederation of the Franks; the Tubantes merged into the confederation of the Saxons.) | | Gallia Belgica (55 BC–c. 5th century AD); Germania Inferior (83–c. 5th century) | | | |
| Frisii | Cana– nefates | Salian Franks | | Batavi | | | |
| unpopulated (4th –c. 5th centuries) | | Saxons | Salian Franks (4th–c. 5th centuries) | | | | |
| Frisian Kingdom (c. 6th century – 734) | | Saxons | Frankish Kingdom (481–843)—Carolingian Empire (800–843) | | | | |
| Frisian Kingdom (c. 6th century – 734) | | Austrasia (511–687) | | | | | |
| Middle Francia (843–855) | | | | West; Francia (from 843) | Middle Francia (843–855) | | |
| Kingdom of Lotharingia (Note: Part of East Francia after 939, divided in Upper Lorraine (as part of West Francia) and Lower Lorraine (as part of East Francia) in 959.) (855–959); Duchy of Lower Lorraine (Note: Lower Lorraine—also referred to as Lothier—disintegrated into several smaller independent territories and only the title of a "Duke of Lothier" remained, held by Brabant.) (from 959) | | | Kingdom of Lotharingia (855–959); Duchy of Lower Lorraine (from 959) | West; Francia (from 843) | Kingdom of Lotharingia (855–959); Duchy of Lower Lorraine (from 959) | | |
| Frisia | | | Kingdom of Lotharingia (855–959); Duchy of Lower Lorraine (from 959) | County of Flanders (Note: Including County of Artois (part of Flanders until 1237) and Tournaisis.) (862–1384) | Kingdom of Lotharingia (855–959); Duchy of Lower Lorraine (from 959) | | |
| Frisian; Freedom (Note: Lordship of Frisia and Lordship of Groningen (including the Ommelanden) after 1524 and 1536 respectively.) (11th–16th centuries) | County of Holland (Note: Including County of Zeeland, that was ruled by neighboring County of Holland and County of Flanders (until 1432).) (880–1432) | Bishopric of Utrecht (Note: Utrecht included Lordship of Overijssel (until 1528), County of Drenthe (until 1528) and County of Zutphen (until 1182).) (695–1456) | Duchy of Brabant (Note: Duchy of Brabant included since 1288 also the Duchy of Limburg (now part of Belgium's Liège Province) and the "Overmaas" lands Dalhem, Valkenburg and Herzogenrath (now part of the Dutch Province of Limburg).) (1183–1430) Duchy of Guelders (Note: The county, later duchy, of Guelders consisted of four quarters, as they were separated by rivers: situated upstream Upper Quarter (the present day northern half of the Dutch province of Limburg), spatially separated from the three downstream Lower Quarters: County of Zutphen (after 1182), Veluwe Quarter and Nijmegen Quarter. The three lower quarters emerged from the historic gau Hamaland (named after the Chamavi tribe), and formed the present day province of Gelderland. Guelders did not include the Cleves enclave Huissen and the independent counties of Buren and Culemborg, that were much later seceded to the province of Gelderland.) (1046–1543) | County of Flanders (862–1384) | County of Hainaut (1071–1432) County of Namur (981–1421) | Prince- Bishopric of Liège (Note: Throughout the Middle Ages, the bishopric was further expanded with the Duchy of Bouillon in 1096 (ceded to France in 1678), the acquisition of the county of Loon in 1366 and the county of Horne in 1568. The Lordship of Mechelen was also part of the Prince-Bishopric of Liège.)(980–1791) | Duchy of Luxembourg (1059–1443) |
| Frisian; Freedom (11th–16th centuries) | Burgundian Netherlands (1384–1482) | | | | | Prince- Bishopric of Liège (980–1791) | Burgundian Netherlands (1384–1482) |
| Habsburg Netherlands (1482–1795) (Seventeen Provinces after 1543) (Note: The name Seventeen Provinces came in use after the Habsburg emperor Charles V had re-acquired the Duchy of Guelders, and an continuous territory arose.) | | | | | | Prince- Bishopric of Liège (980–1791) | Habsburg Netherlands (1482–1795) (Seventeen Provinces after 1543) |
| Dutch Republic (1581–1795) | | | | Spanish Netherlands (1556–1714) | | Prince- Bishopric of Liège (980–1791) | Spanish Netherlands (1556–1714) |
| Dutch Republic (1581–1795) | | | | Austrian Netherlands (1714–1795) | | Prince- Bishopric of Liège (980–1791) | Austrian Netherlands (1714–1795) |
| Dutch Republic (1581–1795) | | | | United States of Belgium (1790) | | Republic of Liège (1789–'91) | United States of Belgium (1790) |
| Dutch Republic (1581–1795) | | | | Austrian Netherlands (1795–1797) | | P.-Bish. of Liège (1791–1794) | Austrian Netherlands (1795–1797) |
| Batavian Republic (1795–1806); Kingdom of Holland (1806–1810) | | | associated with French First Republic (1795–1804) part of First French Empire (1804–1815) | | | | |
| part of First French Empire (1810–1813) | | | associated with French First Republic (1795–1804) part of First French Empire (1804–1815) | | | | |
| Sovereign Principality of the Netherlands (1813–1815) | | | associated with French First Republic (1795–1804) part of First French Empire (1804–1815) | | | | |
| United Kingdom of the Netherlands (1815–1830) | | | | | | | Grand Duchy of Luxembourg (from 1815) |
| Kingdom of the Netherlands (from 1839) | | | | Kingdom of Belgium (from 1830) | | | Grand Duchy of Luxembourg (from 1815) |
| Kingdom of the Netherlands (from 1839) | | | | Kingdom of Belgium (from 1830) | | | Grand Duchy of Luxembourg (from 1890) |

In 1789, a church-inspired popular revolt broke out in reaction to the Emperor's centralizing and anticlerical policies. Two factions appeared: the Statists who opposed the reforms, and the Vonckists named for Jan Frans Vonck who initially supported the reforms but then joined the opposition, due to the clumsy way in which the reforms were carried out.

The uprising started in Brabant, which in January 1789 declared that it no longer recognized the Emperor's rule. The leader of the Statisten faction, Henri Van der Noot, crossed the border into the Dutch Republic and raised a small army in Breda in Staats-Brabant, the northern (Dutch Republic) part of Brabant.

In October, he invaded Brabant and captured Turnhout, defeating the Austrians in the Battle of Turnhout on 27 October. Ghent was taken on 13 November, and on 17 November the governors Albert Casimir and Maria Christina fled Brussels. The remains of the imperial forces withdrew behind the citadel walls of Luxembourg and Antwerp.

Van der Noot now declared Brabant independent, and all the other provinces of the Austrian Netherlands (except Luxembourg) soon followed suit. On 11 January 1790 they signed a pact, establishing a confederation under the name Verenigde Nederlandse Staten / États-Belgiques-Unis (United Belgian States) and a governing body known as the Sovereign Congress. The Dutch Act of Abjuration in 1581 and the American Declaration of Independence in 1776 served as models for the Declaration of Independence of Flanders and some of the other provinces between November 1789 and early 1790. Shortly afterwards, the Articles of Confederation served as a model for the Treaty of the United Belgian States of 11 January 1790.

Independently, in 1789, a revolution had broken out in Liège. The revolutionaries established a republic which joined the United Belgian States in a semblance of an alliance.

Realizing the fragility of the new state, Van der Noot approached foreign states for support and suggested a unification with the Dutch Republic, with little success. Furthermore, the Statist and Vonckist factions were in constant conflict, bordering on civil war.

=== Suppression of the Revolt ===
On 27 February 1790 Joseph II died and his brother Leopold II succeeded him as emperor. Leopold II quickly moved to recapture the Austrian Netherlands. On 24 October 1790 imperial troops took the city of Namur, forcing the province of Namur to recognize the authority of the Emperor. Two days later, the province of West Flanders followed suit, and by December the entire territory was again in imperial hands.

The Austrian restoration and hegemony was historically brief however, as the region was overrun by the French Revolutionary Army in 1794 during the French Revolutionary Wars, and was annexed by France on 1 October 1795.

== Legacy ==
Though short-lived, the United Belgian States had long-lasting repercussions. It had given the Southern Netherlands their first taste of independence, and had sparked a new political idea: the state of Belgium. In 1830, the inhabitants of the Southern Netherlands successfully revolted against the Netherlands during the Belgian Revolution, creating the modern state of Belgium.

== See also ==
- Republic of Liège
- Brabant Revolution
