= Austrian Netherlands =

Austrian territory (1714–1797)

Austrian Netherlands Österreichische Niederlande (German) Pays-Bas Autrichiens (French) Oostenrijkse Nederlanden (Dutch) Belgium Austriacum (Latin)
- 1714–1797
- Civil Ensign Coat of arms

- The Austrian Netherlands in 1789: Austrian Netherlands; Habsburg monarchy

- Status: Imperial fiefs forming a personal union under the suzerainty of the Habsburg Monarchy.
- Capital: Brussels
- Common languages: Flemish, Dutch, Brabantian, Luxembourgish, Limburgish, Picard, Walloon, Latin, French, German.
- Religion: Roman Catholic
- Government: Governorate
- Governor
  - 1716–1724 (first): Eugene Francis
  - 1793–1794 (last): Charles Louis
- Plenipotentiary
  - 1714–1716 (first): Lothar Dominik
  - 1793–1794 (last): Franz Karl
  - Upper house: Habsburg
  - Lower house: Bourbon
- Historical era: Early modern
  - Treaty of Rastatt: 7 March 1714
  - Treaty of Fontainebleau: 8 November 1785
  - Brabant Revolution: 1789–1790
  - Battle of Sprimont: 18 September 1794
  - Treaty of Campo Formio: 17 October 1797
- Currency: Kronenthaler
Preceded by	Succeeded by
Spanish Netherlands	French First Republic; United Belgian States
- Today part of: Netherlands; Belgium; Germany; Luxembourg

The Austrian Netherlands (Note: Dutch: Oostenrijkse Nederlanden; French: Pays-Bas Autrichiens; German: Österreichische Niederlande; Latin: Belgium Austriacum) were the territory of the Burgundian Circle of the Holy Roman Empire between 1714 and 1797. The period began with the acquisition by the Austrian Habsburg monarchy of the former Spanish Netherlands under the Treaty of Rastatt in 1714. It lasted until Revolutionary France annexed the territory after the Battle of Sprimont in 1794 and the Peace of Basel in 1795. Austria relinquished its claim on the province in 1797 through the Treaty of Campo Formio.

The Netherlands, previously the Burgundian Netherlands – inherited by the Spanish branch of the Habsburgs – revolted against the absolutism and centralism of their common sovereign Philip II of Spain. The revolt launched into a war and this led to the formation of the Republic of the United Provinces in the northern part of the Netherlands, in 1568. The new state would have its independence recognized by the King of Spain in 1648, following the Treaty of Münster. In the southern part of the Netherlands, Philip II and his successors managed to retain ten provinces of the original seventeen provinces as part of a diminished Spanish Netherlands.

In 1700, King Charles II of Spain designated the French Prince Philip of Anjou, grandson of Louis XIV, as his successor. He preferred him to a member of the cousin branch of the Austrian Habsburgs. Louis XIV accepted this choice on behalf of his wife, whose dowry had never been paid. A coalition was formed between the Austrian Habsburgs, England, and the United Provinces against Louis XIV's France and Philip V's Spain.

This marked the beginning of the War of the Spanish Succession (1701–1714), during which the Spanish Netherlands were occupied by France on behalf of Louis XIV's grandson.

At the end of this war (Treaties of Utrecht in 1713 and Rastatt in 1714), the Kingdom of Spain remained in the hands of Philip V. However, he had to relinquish the Spanish Netherlands, which were transferred to the House of Austria, constituting a sort of buffer state between the United Provinces and France. The Treaty of the Barrier (1715) granted the United Provinces the right to garrison certain strongholds in the Austrian Netherlands. These were again occupied by France during the War of the Austrian Succession (1744–1748). The Treaty of Aix-la-Chapelle returned them to Maria Theresa in 1748.

== History ==
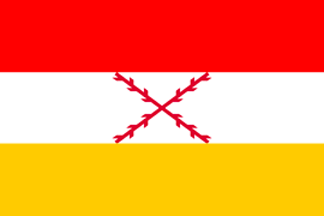
Naval jack of Flanders in the 18th century

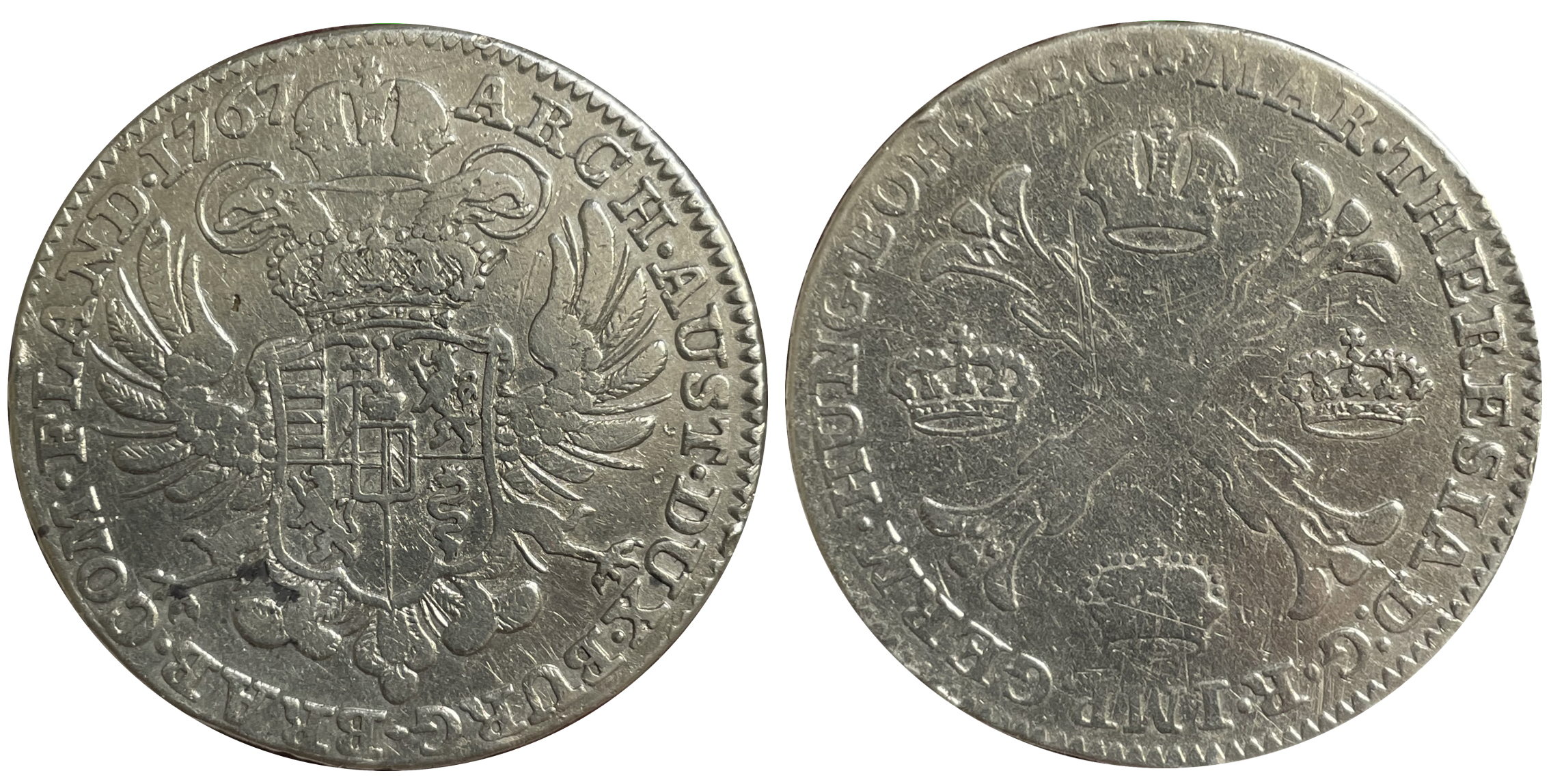
Silver coin: 1 kronenthaler Maria Theresa, 1767

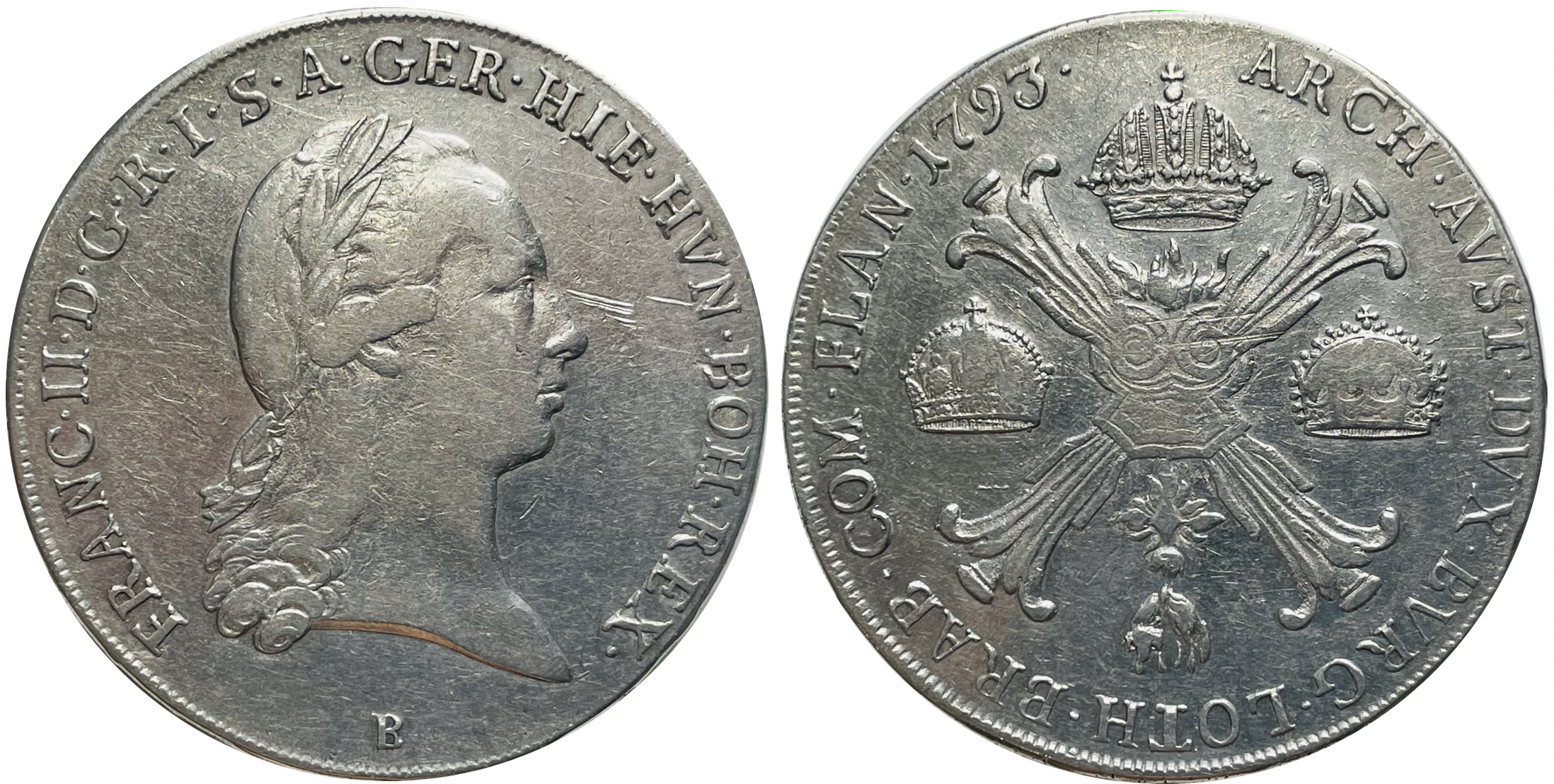
Silver coin 1 kronenthaler Francis II, 1793

The Eighty Years' War (1568–1648) later led to a division of the Low Countries between the Dutch Republic in the north and the Southern Netherlands, which later became Belgium and Luxembourg. The area had been held by the Habsburgs, but was briefly under Bourbon control in the War of the Spanish Succession. Under the Treaty of Rastatt (1714) which ended that war, the remainder of the Spanish Netherlands was ceded to Austria. Administratively, the country was divided into four traditional duchies, three counties and various lordships.

=== From the Burgundian Netherlands to the Austrian Netherlands (1477–1714) ===
The Burgundian Circle in 1512

The provinces of the Netherlands, which at the end of the reign of Charles V (1555), numbered seventeen (the Seventeen Provinces), were gathered by the dukes of Burgundy from 1384 to 1477. The main ones were the Duchy of Brabant, the County of Artois, the County of Flanders, the County of Hainaut, the Duchy of Luxembourg, the County of Namur, the County of Holland, and the County of Zeeland. Most of them are part of the Holy Empire, except Artois and Flanders, fiefs of the Kingdom of France.

The death of Charles the Bold led to a conflict with France, the War of the Burgundian Succession, at the end of which Charles's successor, Philip the Handsome, son of Mary of Burgundy (1457–1482) and the Habsburg Maximilian I (Holy Roman Emperor) but retained the remaining Burgundian possessions (County of Burgundy and the Burgundian Netherlands).

His successor, Charles of Habsburg (1500–1558), who became ruler of the Netherlands in 1516, became king of Castile and king of Aragon the same year, and in 1519, upon the death of Maximilian, he became head of the House of Habsburg and was elected emperor under the now common name of Charles V (Charles V). To the Dutch provinces he already held, he added Tournai (1521), the Principality of Utrecht (1528) and the Duchy of Guelders (1543), and obtained from the King of France the end of French suzerainty over Artois and Flanders (Treaty of Madrid of 1526), which were integrated into the Empire.

As early 1512, Maximilian I grouped the possessions of the House of Burgundy into an imperial circle, the Burgundian Circle (the other nine being Austria, Bavaria, Swabia, Franconia, Upper and Lower Saxony, Westphalia, the Upper Rhine, and the Lower Rhine).

By an ordinance of 26 June 1548, the Transaction of Augsburg, Charles V gave the Circle of Burgundy a special status within the Empire, ensuring it almost-independence. (Note: François Marchal, "Histoire politique du règne de l'empereur Charles V", 1836: The purpose of this treaty was to note and cement by solemn knots the old union, and to ensure the Circle of Burgundy a new protection, while nevertheless preserving the right enjoyed by the Netherlands, to be freed from the jurisdiction of the Empire.)

When Charles V abdicated sovereignty of the Netherlands in October 1555, he passed it on to his eldest son Philip, who also became King of Spain in January 1556, while the Habsburg possessions in Austria went to Ferdinand (1503–1564), Charles's brother. This established a special bond between the Burgundian Netherlands and the Spanish crown. The unity of the Netherlands was reinforced in 1561 by the reorganization of the dioceses: creation of the primatial seat of Malines, of two other archbishoprics (Cambrai and Utrecht) and of fifteen dioceses.

The relations between Philip II (King of Spain) and his Dutch subjects quickly turned sour. In 1566, the Eighty Years' War began, which escalated into a war in 1568 under the leadership of Prince William The Silent. In 1581, the insurgent provinces and cities of the Union of Utrecht proclaimed Philip II's deposition (Act of Abjuration). The war continued, allowing Philip's troops to reconquer Ghent, Brussels, and the Siege of Antwerp (1585), but the provinces of Holland, Zeeland, Utrecht, and Friesland were lost for good. This loss was made official in 1648, when the King of Spain recognized the independence of the Republic of the Seven United Provinces of the Netherlands.

By the end of the 16th century, the Circle of Burgundy was thus reduced to the southern provinces: the Duchy of Brabant, with the Marquisate of Antwerp, the Duchy of Limburg and the three territories of Outre-Meuse (the lands of Fauquemont, Daelem, and Rolduc), the Duchy of Luxembourg and the County of Chiny, the Duchy of Guelders, the County of Flanders, the County of Hainaut, the County of Namur, the Lordship of Mechelen, and the Bailiwick of Tournai and Tournaisis. The territory of the Spanish Netherlands was discontinuous: indeed, even though it was under the protectorate of the King of Spain, the vast Episcopal Principality of Liège remained in the hands of its prince, (Note: Unlike the Prince-Bishopric of Utrecht, whose temporal property was confiscated in 1543 by Charles V.) the Bishop of Liège, a vassal of the Emperor. South of Liège, the less important Principality of Stavelot-Malmedy found itself in a similar situation.

These are the provinces which fell to the Habsburgs of Austria in 1714, the principalities of Liège and Stavelot-Malmedy continuing to be separate.

=== Brabant Revolution ===
In the 1780s, opposition emerged to the liberal reforms of Emperor Joseph II, which were perceived as an attack on the Catholic Church and the traditional institutions of the Austrian Netherlands. Resistance grew, focused in the autonomous and wealthy Duchy of Brabant and County of Flanders. In the aftermath of rioting and disruption in 1787 known as the Small Revolution, many opponents took refuge in the neighboring Dutch Republic where they formed a rebel army. Soon after the outbreak of the French and Liège revolutions, the émigré army crossed into the Austrian Netherlands and decisively defeated the Austrians at the Battle of Turnhout on 27 October 1789. The rebels, supported by uprisings across the territory, soon took control over much of the territory and proclaimed independence. Despite the tacit support of Prussia, the independent United Belgian States, established in January 1790, received no foreign recognition and soon became divided along ideological lines. The Vonckists led by Jan Frans Vonck advocated progressive and liberal government, whereas the Statists, led by Hendrik Van der Noot, were staunchly conservative and supported by the Church. The Statists, who had a wider base of support, drove the Vonckists into exile through terror.

By mid-1790, Habsburg Austria ended its war with the Ottoman Empire and prepared to suppress the rebels. The new Holy Roman Emperor, Leopold II, was also a liberal and proposed an amnesty for the rebels. After defeating a Statist army at the Battle of Falmagne (22 September 1790), the territory was soon overrun and the revolution was defeated by December. The Austrian reestablishment was short-lived and the territory was overrun by the French in 1794 (during the War of the First Coalition) after the Battle of Fleurus.

=== Imperial Council of State ===
The Council of State acted as government, and formed the council by imperial consent:

- Baron Franz von Reischach, Imperial Diplomat
- Cardinal Christoph Bartholomäus Anton Migazzi
- Cardinal von Frankenberg
- Baron of Gottignies, Imperial Lord Chamberlain
- Philippe von Cobenzl, vice Chancellor of the Imperial Council of State.
- Henri d'Ognies, Prince of Grimberghen, Imperial Lord Chamberlain
- Count of Neny president of the Privy Council, member of the Imperial Council of State
- Count of Woestenraedt, Imperial Lord Chamberlain.
- Marquess of Chasteler, Lord Chamberlain
- Count of Gommegnies, President of the Council of Hainaut
- Viscount of Villers; Imperial Treasurer General
- Franz Joseph, Prince of Gavre: Grand Marshall of the Imperial Court of the Archduchess.

== French rule ==
1794 was the third year of the War of the First Coalition. The Austrians gave up on contesting the Low Countries after the Battle of Fleurus (26 June), and left them to the French. After three months of military occupation, on 15 October a Central High Administration of Belgium was installed. On 1 October 1795 the departments were activated and the definitive annexation started, liquidating the Belgian Governing Council, which ceased on 22 November. France annexed the Austrian Netherlands from the Holy Roman Empire and integrated them into the French Republic. The commissioner of the Directory, Louis Ghislain de Bouteville du Metz, finished his work on January 20, 1797, after which no common Belgian authority remained.

== Citations ==
=== Sources ===
- Pirenne, H. (1926). La Fin du régime Espagnol: Le régime autrichien ; La révolution Brabançonne et la révolution liégeoise. La Renaissance du Livre.
- Heinrich Benedikt. Als Belgien österreichisch war. Herold, Vienna, 1965.
