= Left Bank of the Rhine =

Bank of the Rhine River

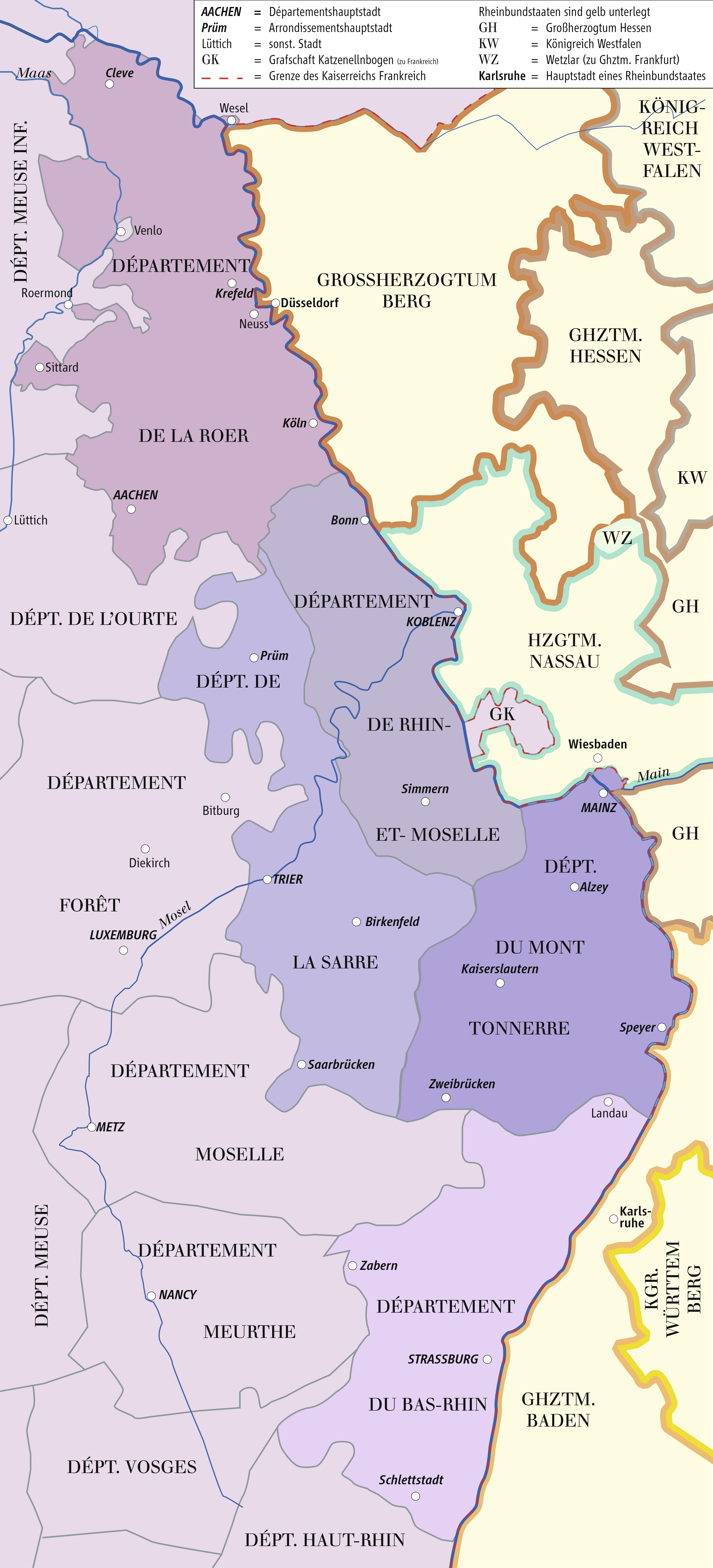
The left Rhine départements in 1812

Boundaries of Napoleonic France in 1812

The Left Bank of the Rhine (German: Linkes Rheinufer, French: Rive gauche du Rhin) was the region north of Lauterbourg that is now in western Germany and was conquered during the War of the First Coalition and annexed by the French First Republic.

After the French attempt to create a Cisrhenian Republic had foundered, the territories west of the Rhine were reorganised into several French Departments. After the allied victory over Napoleon I in 1814, the territories were temporarily administered by the Central Administrative Departement (Zentralverwaltungsdepartement). The Sarre province and the district of Landau in der Pfalz, which had been French before the Napoleonic Wars, became by the final act of the Congress of Vienna ceded to the members of the anti-Napoleonic coalition. The annexations done under the First Republic were undone. From those territories, the Bavarian Circle of the Rhine (Rheinkreis) and the Hessian province of Rhenish Hesse (Rheinhessen) were formed in 1816.

The regions in the north went to Prussia and were initially part of the two provinces of Jülich-Cleves-Berg and the Grand Duchy of the Lower Rhine, from which the Rhine Province emerged in 1822. The southern Left Bank territories, which had been part of the Holy Roman Empire until they were seized by France, mostly in the 17th century during Louis XIV's wars, were annexed by the new German Empire in 1871, after France's defeat in the Franco-Prussian War. Parts of the region were consolidated into the Imperial Territory of Alsace-Lorraine for 48 years (1871–1919), but Alsace–Lorraine itself was restored to France after the First World War. The remainder of the Rhineland was retained by Germany, albeit under Allied occupation from 1918 to 1930.

== French Revolution ==
By the late autumn of 1794, the French Army had occupied the left bank of the Rhine. The legal annexation of the territories was formally prepared at the Treaty of Leoben (1797) and concluded by the Treaties of Camp Formio (1797) and Lunéville (1801).

At the 1795 Peace of Basel, all of the Left Bank of the Rhine was taken by France. Its population was about 1.6 million and was divided into numerous small states. In 1806, all of the Rhenish princes joined the Confederation of the Rhine, a puppet state of Napoleon. France took direct control of the Rhineland until 1814 and radically and permanently liberalized its government, society and economy. The coalition of France's enemies made repeated efforts to retake the region, but France repelled all of its attempts.

The French swept away centuries worth of outmoded restrictions and introduced unprecedented levels of efficiency. The chaos and barriers in a land divided and subdivided among many different petty principalities gave way to a rational simplified centralised system controlled by Paris and run by Napoleon's relatives. The most important impact came from the abolition of all feudal privileges and historic taxes, the introduction of legal reforms of the Napoleonic Code and the reorganisation of the judicial and local administrative systems. The economic integration of the Rhineland with France increased prosperity, especially in industrial production, and business accelerated with the new efficiency and lowered trade barriers. The Jews were liberated from the ghetto. There was only limited resistance, and most Germans welcomed the new regime, especially the urban elites, but one sore point was the hostility of the French officials toward the Catholic Church, the religion of most inhabitants.

The reforms were permanent, and decades later, workers and peasants in the Rhineland still often appealed to Jacobinism to oppose unpopular government programs. The intelligentsia demanded the maintenance of the Napoleonic Code, which remained in effect for a century.

== Administrative structure ==
In 1798 the administration of the region was reorganized along French lines and it was divided into départements. The French Directory charged the Alsatian, François-Joseph Rudler, with this task and appointed him as the "General Ruling Commissar of All Conquered Lands between the Meuse and the Rhine and the Rhine and the Moselle". Rudler had hitherto been the judge at the Court of Cassation in Paris. His division of the region into four départements lasted until the end of the French period and consisted of:

- Département de la Roer, Rur-Département (capital: Aachen),
- Département de la Sarre, Saardépartement (capital: Trier),
- Département de Rhin-et-Moselle, Département Rhein-Mosel (capital: Koblenz),
- Département du Mont-Tonnerre, Département Donnersberg (capital: Mainz).

An area in the South Palatinate was allocated to the:

- Département Bas-Rhin (capital: Strasbourg).

== Political changes ==
In addition to the centralization of the administration along French lines the rest of French law was introduced. That included the lifting of all estates-based privileges, the creation of egalitarianism, the establishment of a new judicial order and the introduction of the Napoleonic code. Ecclesiastical estates were secularised. Bound up with that was a fundamental restructuring of the land ownership and economic relationships. The primary beneficiaries were the ordinary citizens. Less successful was the area of educational politics. Instead of a reform of the universities, the French administration established specialist high schools.

Criticism came from church-influenced counties as well as, during the Napoleonic period, from former German Jacobins. Whilst the former complained about secularisation, the later protested about the suppression of freedom. Resentment over military conscription was common throughout the population.

== Linguistic relics of the French period ==
During the French period many dialectal words of French origin entered everyday speech, such as Plümo (feather bed), Filou, Monnie (money), and Drottewaar (pavement). In Koblenz the term Schängel appeared, derived from the French Christian name Jean and (apparently pejoratively) referred to the French-fathered children of German mothers.

== See also ==
- Natural borders of France
