= Rhineland =

Historic region of Germany

The Rhine Province (green) as of 1830 superimposed on modern borders.

The Rhineland (German: Rheinland [ˈʁaɪnlant]) is a loosely defined area of Western Germany along the Rhine, chiefly its middle section, sometimes encompassing parts of Belgium. It is the main industrial heartland of Germany because of its many factories, and it has historic ties to the Holy Roman Empire, Prussia, and the German Empire.

== Term ==
Coat of arms of the Rhineland

Historically, the term "Rhinelands" refers to a loosely defined region encompassing the land on the banks of the Rhine, which were settled by Ripuarian and Salian Franks and became part of Frankish Austrasia. In the High Middle Ages, numerous Imperial States along the river emerged from the former stem duchy of Lotharingia, without developing any common political or cultural identity.

A "Rhineland" conceptualization can be traced to the period of the Holy Roman Empire from the sixteenth until the eighteenth centuries when the Empire's Imperial Estates (territories) were grouped into regional districts in charge of defense and judicial execution, known as Imperial Circles. Three of the ten circles through which the Rhine flowed referred to the river in their names: the Upper Rhenish Circle, the Electoral Rhenish Circle, and the Lower Rhenish-Westphalian Circle (very roughly equivalent to the present-day German federal state of North Rhine Westphalia). In the twilight period of the Empire, after the War of the First Coalition, a short-lived Cisrhenian Republic was established (1797–1802). The term covered the whole French annexed territory west of the Rhine (German: Linkes Rheinufer), but also included a small portion of the bridgeheads on the eastern banks. After the defeat of the French empire, the regions of Jülich-Cleves-Berg and Lower Rhine were annexed to the Kingdom of Prussia. In 1822 the Prussian administration reorganized the territory as the Rhine Province (Rheinprovinz, also known as Rhenish Prussia), a tradition that continued in the naming of the current German states of Rhineland-Palatinate and North Rhine-Westphalia.

In the early 1800s, Rhinelanders settled the Missouri Rhineland, a German cultural region and wine-producing area in the U.S. State of Missouri, and named it after noticing similarities in soil and topography to the Rhineland in Europe. By 1860, nearly half of all settlers in Missouri Rhineland came from Koblenz, capital of the Rhine Province.

The western part of the Rhineland was occupied by Entente forces from the end of the First World War until 1930. Under the 1919 Treaty of Versailles, German military presence in the region was banned, a restriction which the government of Weimar Germany pledged to honor in the 1925 Locarno Treaties. Nazi Germany remilitarized the territory in 1936 as part of a diplomatic test of will three years before the outbreak of the Second World War.

== Geography ==
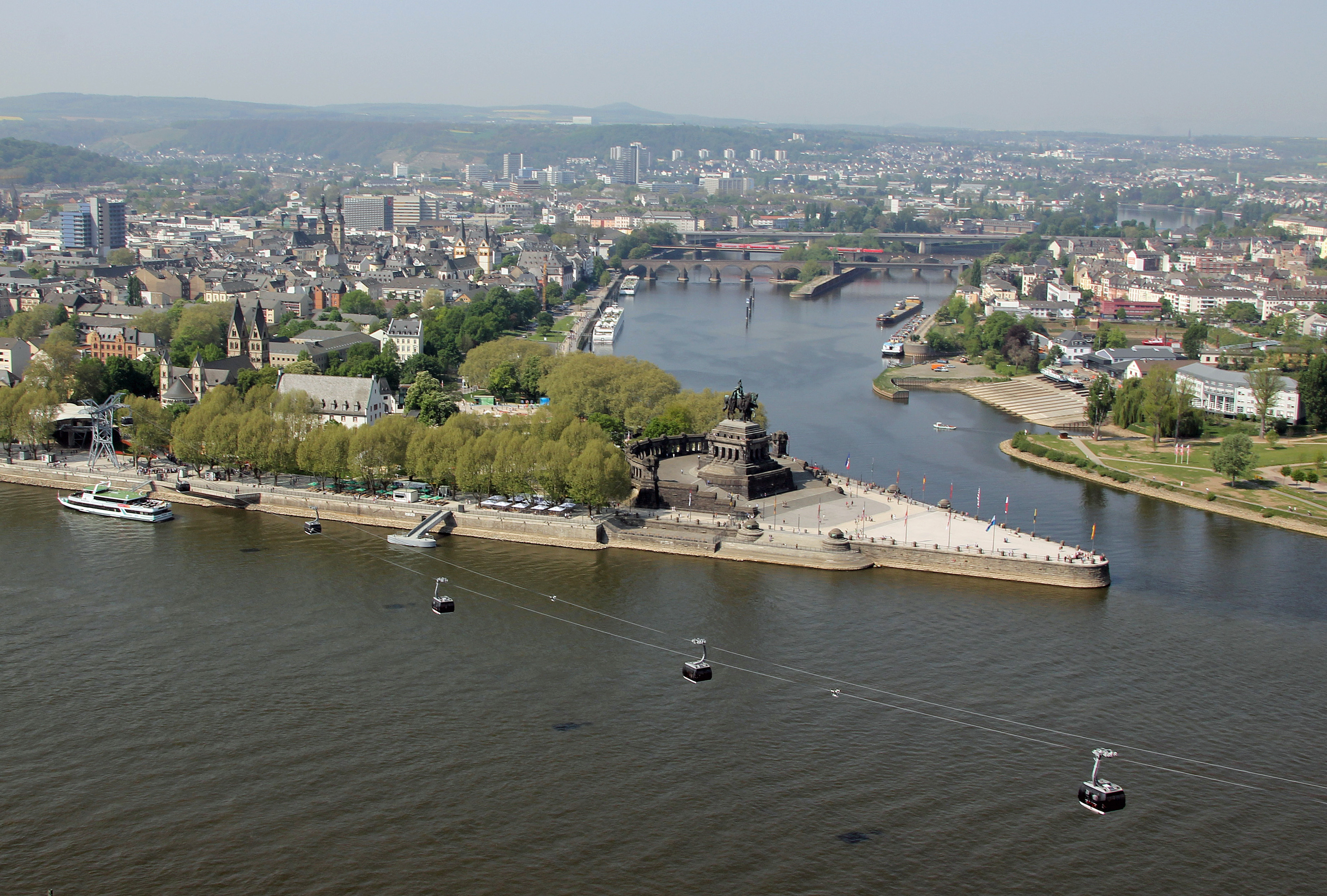
Deutsches Eck, Koblenz

To the west the area stretches to the borders with Luxembourg, Belgium, and the Netherlands; on the eastern side, it encompasses the towns and cities along the river and the Bergisches Land area up to the Westphalian (Siegerland) and Hessian regions. Stretching down to the North Palatine Uplands in the south, this area, except for the Saarland, more or less corresponds with the modern use of the term.

The southern and eastern parts are mainly hill country (Westerwald, Hunsrück, Siebengebirge, Taunus and Eifel), cut by river valleys, principally the Middle Rhine up to Bingen (or very rarely between the confluence with the Neckar and Cologne) and its Ahr, Moselle and Nahe tributaries. The border of the North German plain is marked by the lower Ruhr. In the south, the river cuts the Rhenish Massif.

The area encompasses the western part of the Ruhr industrial region and the Cologne Lowland. Some of the larger cities in the Rhineland are Aachen, Bonn, Cologne, Duisburg, Düsseldorf, Essen, Koblenz, Krefeld, Leverkusen, Mainz, Mönchengladbach, Mülheim an der Ruhr, Oberhausen, Remscheid, Solingen, Trier and Wuppertal.

Toponyms as well as local family names often trace back to the Frankish heritage.The lands on the western shore of the Rhine are strongly characterized by Roman influence, including viticulture. In the core territories, large parts of the population are members of the Catholic Church.

== History ==
=== Pre-Roman ===
At the earliest historical period, the territories between the Ardennes and the Rhine were occupied by the Treveri, the Eburones, and other Celtic tribes, who, however, were all more or less modified and influenced by their Germanic neighbors. On the East bank of the Rhine, between the Main and the Lahn, were the settlements of the Mattiaci, a branch of the Germanic Chatti, while farther to the north were the Usipetes and Tencteri.

=== Romans and Franks ===
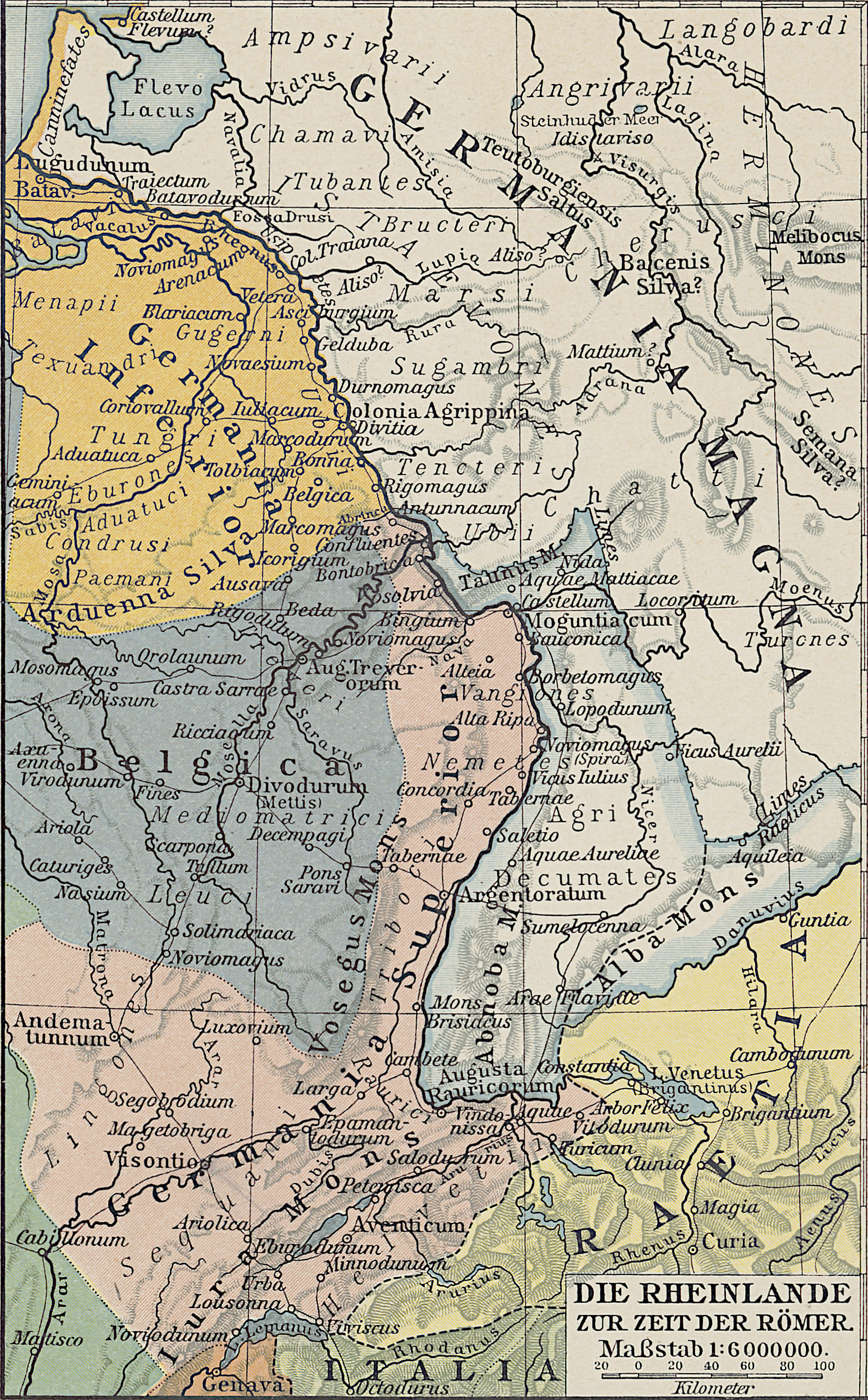
Roman and barbarian parts of the Rhineland

Julius Caesar conquered the Celtic tribes on the West bank, and Augustus established numerous fortified posts on the Rhine, but the Romans never succeeded in gaining a firm footing on the East bank. As the power of the Roman empire declined the Franks pushed forward along both banks of the Rhine, and by the end of the 5th century had conquered all the lands that had formerly been under Roman influence. By the 8th century, the Frankish dominion was firmly established in western Germania and northern Gaul.

On the division of the Carolingian Empire at the Treaty of Verdun the part of the province to the east of the river fell to East Francia, while that to the west remained with the kingdom of Lotharingia.

=== Holy Roman Empire ===
The Holy Roman Empire in 1618

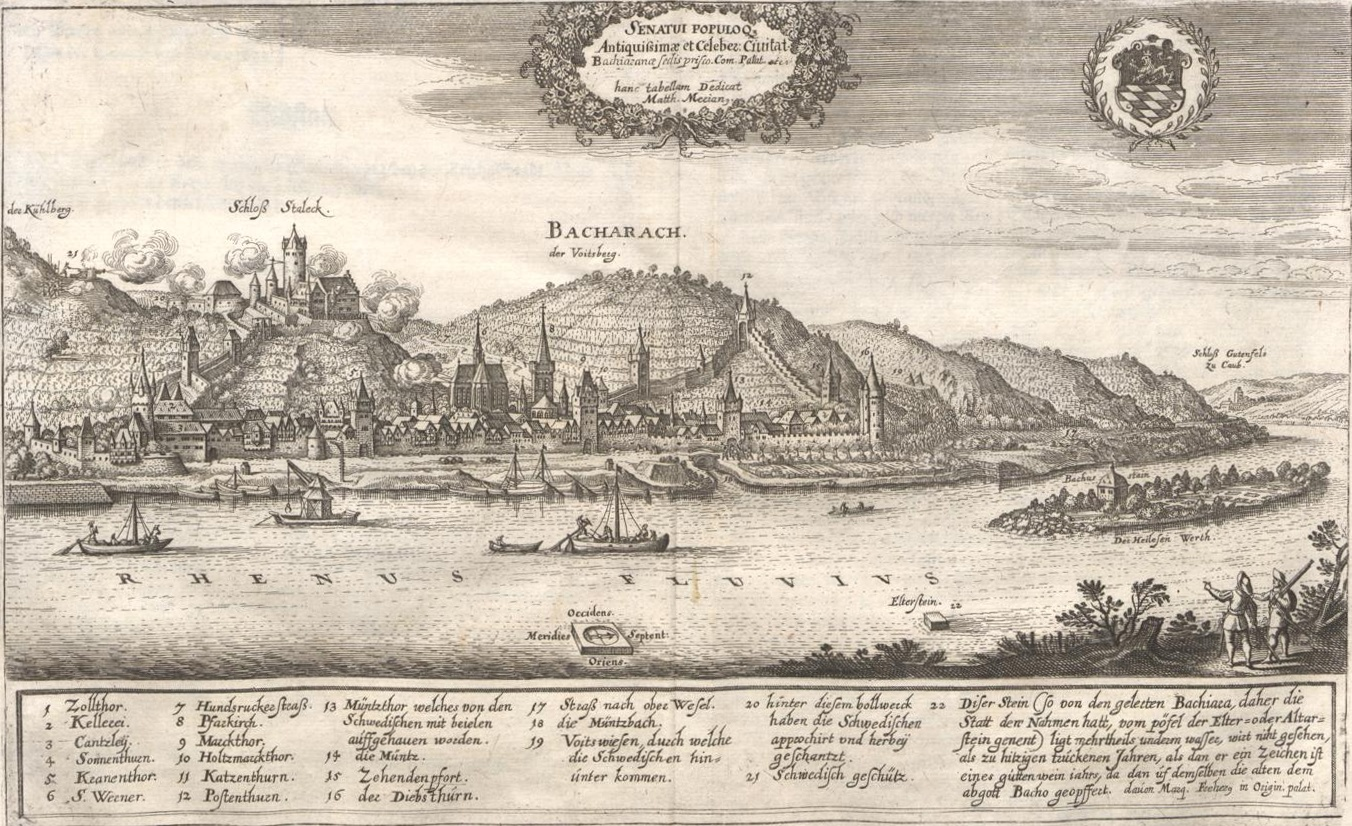
Attack by the Swedish army on the Spanish troops in Bacharach during the Thirty Years' War

By the time of Emperor Otto I (d. 973) both banks of the Rhine had become part of the Holy Roman Empire, and in 959 the Rhenish territory was divided between the duchies of Upper Lorraine, on the Mosel, and Lower Lorraine on the Meuse.

As the central power of the Holy Roman Emperor weakened, the Rhineland disintegrated into numerous small independent principalities, each with its separate vicissitudes and special chronicles. The old Lotharingian divisions became obsolete, and while the Lower Lorraine lands were referred to as the Low Countries, the name of Lorraine became restricted to the region on the upper Moselle that still bears it. After the Imperial Reform of 1500/12, the territory was part of the Lower Rhenish–Westphalian, Upper Rhenish, and Electoral Rhenish Circles. Notable Rhenish Imperial States included:

- the ecclesiastical electorates of Cologne (without Westphalian possessions) and Trier
- the duchies of Jülich, Cleves, and Berg, forming the United Duchies of Jülich-Cleves-Berg from 1521
- the County of Sponheim and numerous further Imperial Counties
- the Free Imperial Cities of Aachen and Cologne.

Despite its dismembered condition and the sufferings it underwent at the hands of its French neighbors in various periods of warfare, the Rhenish territory prospered greatly and stood in the foremost rank of German culture and progress. Aachen was the place of coronation of the German emperors, and the ecclesiastical principalities of the Rhine played a large role in German history.

=== French Revolution ===
At the Peace of Basel in 1795, the whole of the left bank of the Rhine was taken by France. The population was about 1.6 million in numerous small states. In 1806, the Rhenish princes all joined the Confederation of the Rhine, a puppet of Napoleon. France took direct control of the Rhineland until 1814 and radically and permanently liberalized the government, society, and economy. The Coalition of France's enemies made repeated efforts to retake the region, but France repelled all the attempts.

The French swept away centuries worth of outmoded restrictions and introduced unprecedented levels of efficiency. The chaos and barriers in a land divided and subdivided among many different petty principalities gave way to a rational, simplified, centralized system controlled by Paris and run by Napoleon's relatives. The most important impact came from the abolition of all feudal privileges and historic taxes, the introduction of legal reforms of the Napoleonic Code, and the reorganization of the judicial and local administrative systems. The economic integration of the Rhineland with France increased prosperity, especially in industrial production, while business accelerated with the new efficiency and lowered trade barriers. The Jews were liberated from the ghetto. There was limited resistance; most Germans welcomed the new regime, especially the urban elites, but one sour point was the hostility of the French officials toward the Roman Catholic Church, the choice of most of the residents. The reforms were permanent. Decades later workers and peasants in the Rhineland often appealed to Jacobinism to oppose unpopular government programs, while the intelligentsia demanded the maintenance of the Napoleonic Code (which stayed in effect for a century).

=== Prussian influence ===
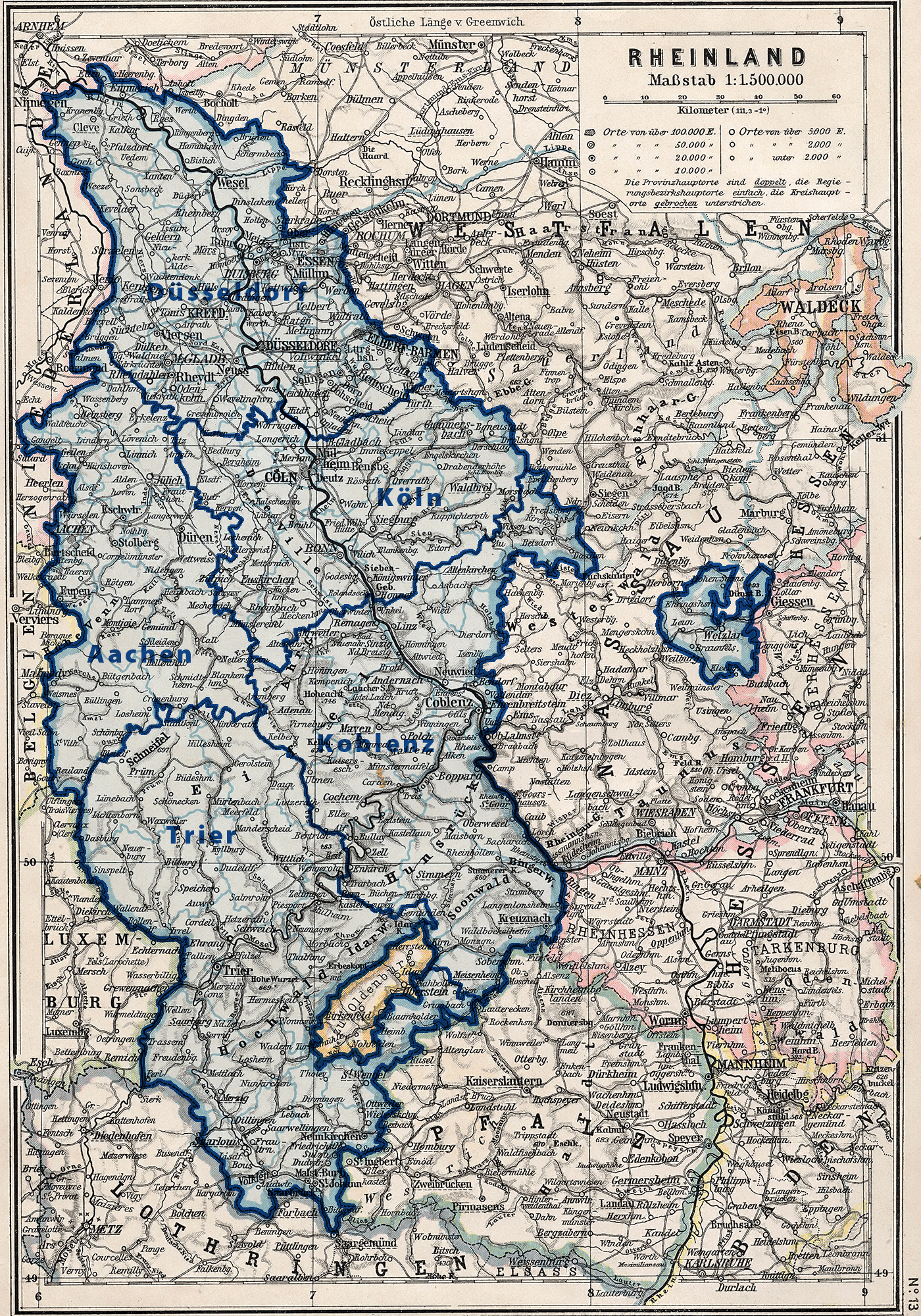
Regierungsbezirke of the Prussian Rhine Province, 1905 map

A Prussian influence began on a small scale in 1609 by the occupation of the Duchy of Cleves. A century later, Upper Guelders and Moers also became Prussian. The Congress of Vienna expelled the French and assigned the whole of the lower Rhenish districts to Prussia, who left them in undisturbed possession of the liberal institutions to which they had become accustomed under the French. The Rhine Province remained part of Prussia after Germany was unified in 1871.

=== 1918–1945 ===
The occupation of the Rhineland took place following the Armistice with Germany of 11 November 1918. The occupying armies consisted of American, Belgian, British and French forces. Under the Treaty of Versailles, German troops were banned from all territory west of the Rhine and within 50 kilometers east of the Rhine.

In 1920, under massive French pressure, the Saar was separated from the Rhine Province and administered by the League of Nations until a plebiscite in 1935, when the region was returned to Germany. At the same time, in 1920, the districts of Eupen and Malmedy were transferred to Belgium (see German-Speaking Community of Belgium).

In January 1923, in response to Germany's failure to meet its reparations obligations, French and Belgian troops occupied the Ruhr district, strictly controlling all important industrial areas. The Germans responded with passive resistance, which led to hyperinflation, and the French gained very little of the reparations they wanted. French troops left the Ruhr in August 1925.

The occupation of the remainder of the Rhineland ended on 30 June 1930.

On 7 March 1936, in violation of the Treaty of Versailles, German troops marched into the Rhineland and other regions along the Rhine. After 1918, territory west of the Rhine had been off-limits to the German military. However, there was no opposition to its re-occupation from other powers such as France and the UK, despite the fact that in 1936 the German forces were not particularly strong and could have been pushed back. This lack of action by other powers gave Hitler confidence and Germany increased its programme of re-armament which led to war in 1939.

Towards the end of the war the Rhineland was the scene of major fighting as the Allied forces overwhelmed the German defenders in 1945.

=== Post-1946 ===
In 1946, the Rhineland was divided into the newly founded states of Hesse, North Rhine-Westphalia, and Rhineland-Palatinate. North Rhine-Westphalia is one of the prime German industrial areas, containing significant mineral deposits (coal, lead, lignite, magnesium, oil, and uranium) and water transport. In the Rhineland-Palatinate agriculture is more important, including the vineyards in the Ahr, Mittelrhein, and Mosel regions.

== See also ==
- Cologne/Bonn Region
- Lower Rhine region
- Rhineland-Palatinate
- North Rhine-Westphalia
- 6070 Rheinland
