= Upper Guelders =

Former polity in the Netherlands

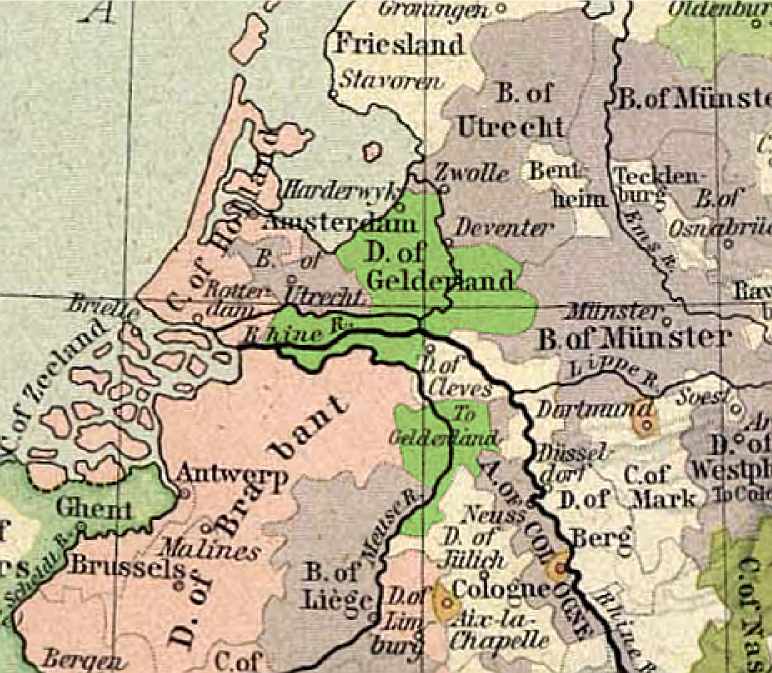
Duchy of Guelders in 1477: Upper Guelders is the smaller southern part

Upper Guelders or Spanish Guelders was one of the four quarters in the Imperial Duchy of Guelders. In the Dutch Revolt, it was the only quarter that did not secede from the Habsburg monarchy to become part of the Seven United Netherlands, but remained under Spanish rule during the Eighty Years' War.

== Geography ==
Within the Low Countries, the counts, later dukes at Geldern started from the 11th century onwards to collect several territories down the Meuse river, which were physically separated from the later acquired lands along the Lower Rhine. These original lands of Upper Guelders were separated by the Dukes of Cleves, a long-time foe of Guelders. The northern territories were administrated within three quarters:

1. Zutphen County,
2. Veluwe Quarter,
3. Nijmegen Quarter with the Land of Meuse and Waal and the Betuwe.

These lower quarters today form the Dutch province of Gelderland.

The most important cities in Upper Guelders were Geldern, Venlo and Roermond. Together with the Duchy of Cleves, the region originally was part of the Kleverlandish language area, part of the Low Franconian dialect group.

== History ==
In 1471 Duke Arnold of Guelders, stuck in the conflict with his only surviving son Adolf of Egmond, gained the support of the Burgundian duke Charles the Bold, but in turn had to give his duchy in pawn. Charles seized Guelders upon Duke Arnold's death in 1473, and despite the protests raised by the ducal House of Egmond incorporated it into the Burgundian Netherlands, the later dowry of his daughter Mary the Rich to her husband Archduke Maximilian I of Austria from the House of Habsburg.

In 1492 Duke Arnold's grandson Charles of Egmond, backed by the local nobility as well as by King Charles VIII of France, managed to regain the rule over Guelders against the Habsburg claims. However, as he left no heirs, he bequested the duchy to Duke William of Cleves in 1538, who, despite his efforts to marry his sister Anne to King Henry VIII of England, could not prevail against the Habsburg Emperor Charles V. In 1543 William officially renounced Guelders in favour of Charles, who attached the duchy to the Seventeen Provinces of the Habsburg Netherlands. Upon Charles' abdication in 1556, he decreed, that these territories would be inherited by his son King Philip II of Spain.

After Philip's stern Catholic measures had sparked the Dutch Revolt, the three lower quarters of Guelders joined the Protestant states in the 1579 Union of Utrecht, while during most part of the Eighty Years' War, the capital Geldern with Upper Guelders remained in the hands of the Spanish. This was finally confirmed in the 1648 Peace of Münster. The upper territory was therefore also called "Spanish Guelders".

Following the War of the Spanish Succession, by the Treaty of Utrecht in 1713, Upper Guelders was further divided into:

- Prussian Upper Guelders: most part, including the capital Geldern, held by the Kingdom of Prussia. The Electors of Brandenburg (from 1618: Brandenburg-Prussia) had already acquired the neighbouring Duchy of Cleves by the 1614 Treaty of Xanten ending the War of the Jülich Succession.
- States Upper Guelders: Venlo and surroundings became part of the Dutch Republic.
- Jülich Upper Guelders: The town of Erkelenz passed to the Duchy of Jülich, held by the Elector of the Palatinate from the House of Wittelsbach.
- Austrian Upper Guelders: The land around Roermond and some adjacent villages remained under Habsburg rule, then the remaining Austrian branch, the later House of Lorraine. It joined the United States of Belgium in 1790.

According to the Final Act of the Vienna Congress in 1815, the western part of Prussian Upper Guelders and Austrian Upper Guelders also became part of the Dutch province of Limburg. The remaining territory was retained by Prussia: Geldern itself was incorporated into the Province of Jülich-Cleves-Berg, while Erkelenz fell to the Grand Duchy of the Lower Rhine. Both became part of the Prussian Rhine Province in 1822. Up to today, the demarcation line forms the Dutch-German border, though the Limburg territory east of the Meuse river, held by the King of the Netherlands, joined the German Confederation upon the 1839 Treaty of London.
