= Regierungsbezirk Montabaur =

Montabaur Regierungsbezirk Montabaur
- Regierungsbezirk
- Interactive map of Montabaur
- Country: Germany
- State: Rhineland-Palatinate
- Disestablished: 1968-06-30
- Region seat: Montabaur

Area
  - Total: 1,783.22 km^{2} (688.51 sq mi)

Population
  - Total: 278,041
  - Density: 155.921/km^{2} (403.833/sq mi)

Montabaur was one of the five Regierungsbezirke of Rhineland-Palatinate, Germany into which the newly founded state was divided until 1968. The others were: Rheinhessen (established 1946, seat in Mainz), Pfalz (established 1945, seat in Neustadt an der Weinstraße), Koblenz and Trier (both established by Prussia in 1816.

== History ==
Regierungsbezirk Wiesbaden, formed in 1866 as part of the Prussian province of Hesse-Nassau, had been divided by after the Second World War by the occupying powers as it lay astride a zone boundary. The majority of the Regierungsbezirk lay in the American Zone and became part of the state of Hesse in 1945. The Regierungsbezirk of Montabaur had to be created for the smaller northwestern part and became part of the state of Rhineland-Palatinate in 1946.

The Regierungsbezirk of Montabaur was dissolved on 1 October 1968 and incorporated into Koblenz. The area of Regierungsbezirk Montabaur largely corresponds to the modern counties of Rhein-Lahn-Kreis and Westerwaldkreis.

== Former administrative divisions ==
The Regierungsbezirk of Montabaur was divided into the counties of Oberwesterwaldkreis (Westerburg), Loreleykreis (Sankt Goarshausen), Unterlahnkreis (Diez) and Unterwesterwaldkreis (Montabaur).

== Presidents ==
- 1946–1947: Peter Altmeier (1899–1977)
- 1947–1951: Alois Zimmer (1896–1973)
- 1952–1962: Hermann Schüling (1897–1977)
- 1962–1963: Clemens Josef Maria Schlüter (1911–1963)
- 1963–1967: Walter Schmitt (1914–1994) (personal union with Koblenz)
- 1967–1968: Waldemar Leibmann (1923–2004) (personal union with Koblenz)
