= Rhin-et-Moselle =

Former French department (1797–1814)

Coordinates: 50.35°N 7.58333°E

- Department of French First Republic and First French Empire
- 1797–1814
- Location of Rhin-et-Moselle in France (1812)
- Capital: Koblenz
- Area
  - 1812: 5,884.19 km^{2} (2,271.90 sq mi)
- Population
  - 1812: 269,700
- History
  - Established: 1797
  - Disestablished: 1814
- Political subdivisions: 3 arrondissements: Koblenz; Bonn; Simmern
Preceded by
Electorate of Cologne
Electorate of Trier
County Palatine of the Rhine
Succeeded by
Grand Duchy of the Lower Rhine
- Today part of: Germany

Rhin-et-Moselle (French: [ʁɛ̃ e mɔzɛl]; German: Rhein-und-Mosel) was a department of the French First Republic and First French Empire in present-day Germany. It was named after the rivers Rhine and Moselle. It was formed in 1797, when the left bank of the Rhine was annexed by France. Until the French occupation, its territory was divided between the Archbishopric of Cologne, the Archbishopric of Trier, and the Electorate of the Palatinate. Its territory is now part of the German states of Rhineland-Palatinate and North Rhine-Westphalia. Its capital was Koblenz.

After Napoleon was defeated in 1814, the department became part of Prussia.

== History ==
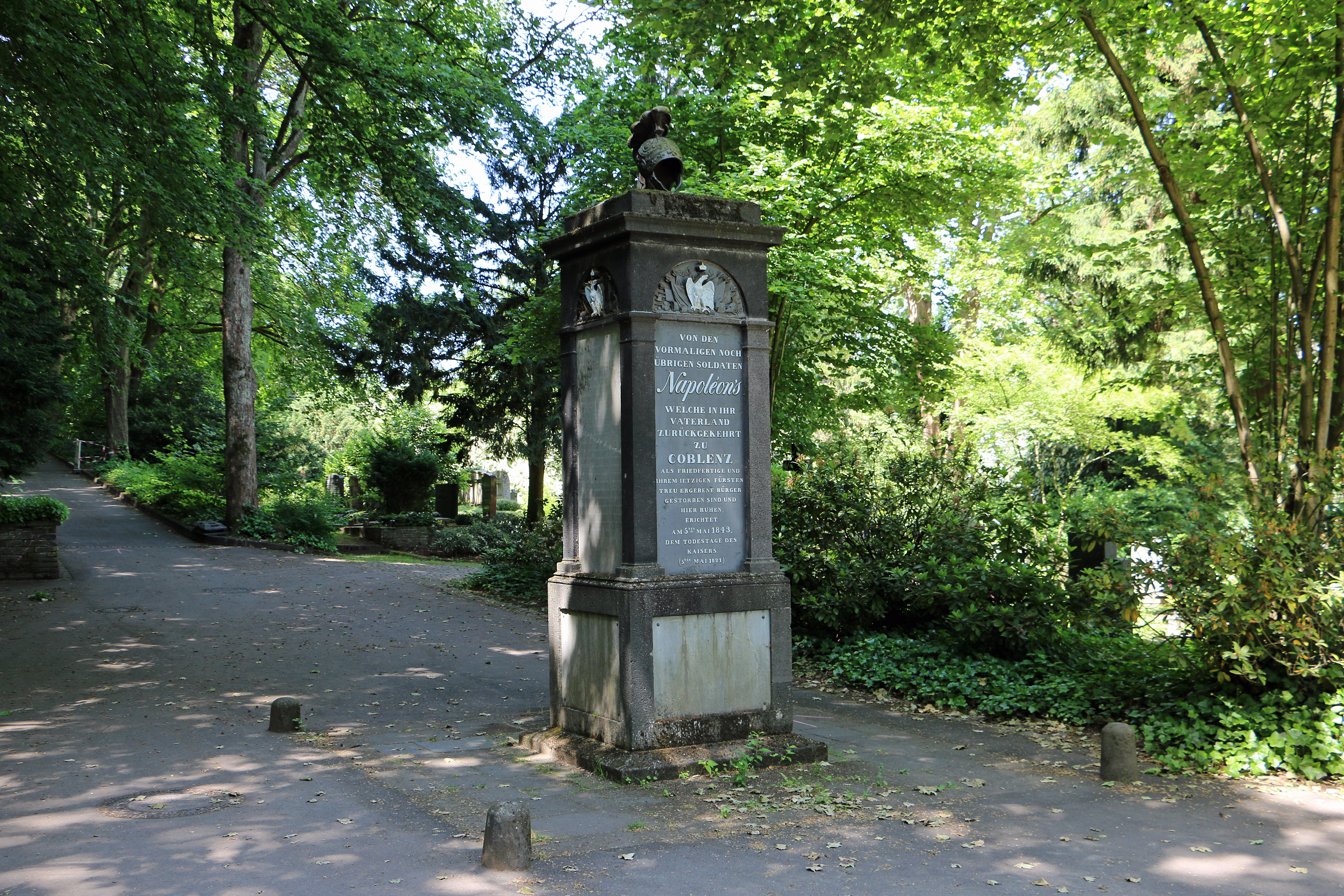
Memorial for the German veterans of the Army of Napoleon in the main cemetery in Koblenz

The Département de Rhin-et-Moselle was established by the French First Republic in 1798 in the territories of the Holy Roman Empire conquered after the War of the First Coalition in 1794, after the failure of the creation of an independent Cisrhenian Republic. The annexation was legalized under international law by the Treaty of Lunéville on February 9, 1801. Since the French had to evacuate the right bank territories according to the peace treaty, they blew up before the old fortress of Ehrenbreitstein.

Following the inauguration of the administrative division, the cities and municipalities of the département received civil administration for the first time. From 1802 all the religious foundations and monasteries in the department were secularized. In the Concordat of 1801 the state guaranteed religious tolerance to the churches. With the dissolution of the ecclesiastical rule and the change of ownership, a new social order emerged. With the adoption of the Code civil from 1804, a modern legal system was introduced, based on individual liberties, equality before the law, the rule of law, the protection of property, and the strict separation of church and state. In the areas of the left bank of the Rhine, it continued even after the French period until the introduction of the Bürgerliches Gesetzbuch in 1900. The new legal system replaced the previous secret inquisition processes and replaced them with public prosecution and jury trials. Furthermore, the male population of the conquered territories was subject to draft into the French army and thus had to participate in the French wars of conquest, including the French invasion of Russia, where many of the soldiers were killed. The French legacy of administration and justice, which was maintained during the Prussian period, allowed much greater scope for liberal aspirations. The Hambach Festival of 1832 and the German revolutions of 1848–49 would have been unimaginable without this legacy.

The Département de Rhin-et-Moselle existed until 1814. On New Year's Eve in 1814, Russian troops together with Blücher's Silesian army crossed the Rhine near Koblenz, Kaub and Mannheim. The French evacuated the département and left it to the Russians and Prussians without a fight. Thereafter, it was administered for a short time as part of the General Government of the Middle Rhine and was finally assigned to the Kingdom of Prussia in 1815 at the Congress of Vienna. Prussia formed the short-lived province of the Grand Duchy of Lower Rhine, the southern forerunner of the Rhine Province, from the areas that it had acquired.

== Prefects ==
The prefects of the department were:

- Philippe Joseph Boucqueau (1800–1803)
- Mouchard de Chaban (1803–1805)
- Alexandre de Lameth (1805–1806)
- Adrien de Lezay-Marnésia (1806–1810)
- Jean Marie Thérèse Doazan (1810–1814)

== Administrative units ==
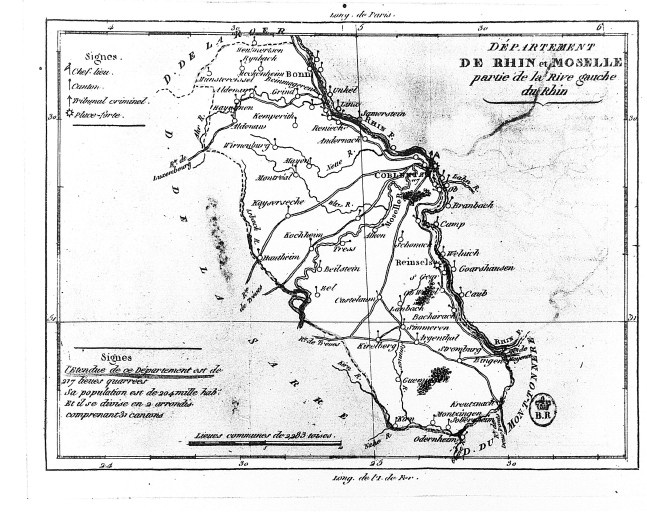
Map of the department of Rhin-et-Moselle

The department was subdivided into the following arrondissements and cantons (situation in 1812):

- Koblenz, cantons: Koblenz, Andernach, Boppard, Cochem, Kaisersesch, Lutzerath, Mayen, Münstermaifeld, Polch, Rübenach, Treis and Zell.
- Bonn, cantons: Bonn (2 cantons), Adenau, Ahrweiler, Remagen, Rheinbach, Ulmen, Virneburg and Wehr.
- Simmern, cantons: Simmern, Bacharach, Kastellaun, Kirchberg, Kirn, Kreuznach, Sankt Goar, Sobernheim, Stromberg and Trarbach.

Its population in 1812 was 269,700, and its area was 588,419 hectares.
