= Roer (department) =

French department (1797–1814)

Coordinates: 51°10′N 6°30′E

Department of Roer Département de la Roer (French)
- Department of the French First Republic and the First French Empire
- 1797–1814
- Location of Roer in France (1812)
- Capital: Aachen
- Area transferred
  - 1808: Wesel from Prussia
- Population
  - 1809: 616,287
  - 1812: 631,094
- History
  - Established: 1797
  - Disestablished: 1814
Preceded by
Duchy of Jülich
Duchy of Cleves
Electorate of Cologne
Free Imperial City of Aachen
Free Imperial City of Cologne
Prussian Guelders
Succeeded by
Kingdom of Prussia
United Kingdom of the Netherlands
- Today part of: Germany; Netherlands

Roer (French: [ʁɔɛʁ]) was a department of the French First Republic and later First French Empire in present-day Germany and the Netherlands. It was named after the river Roer (Rur), which flows through the department. It was formed in 1797, when the left bank of the Rhine was occupied by the French. The department was formed from the duchies of Jülich and Cleves; the part of the Archbishopric of Cologne left of the Rhine; the Free City of Aachen; the Prussian part of the duchy of Guelders; and some smaller territories. In 1805 the city of Wesel was added to the department. The capital was Aix-la-Chapelle (Aachen).

The department was subdivided in the following arrondissements and cantons (situation in 1812):

- Aachen (Aix-la-Chapelle), cantons: Aachen (2 cantons), Burtscheid, Düren, Eschweiler, Froitzheim, Geilenkirchen, Gemünd, Heinsberg, Linnich, Monschau and Sittard.
- Cleves, cantons: Cleves, Geldern, Goch, Horst, Kalkar, Kranenburg, Wankum, Wesel and Xanten.
- Krefeld (Crefeld), cantons: Krefeld, Bracht, Erkelenz, Kempen, Moers, Neersen, Neuss, Odenkirchen, Rheinberg, Uerdingen, Viersen
- Cologne, cantons: Cologne (4 cantons), Bergheim, Brühl, Dormagen, Elsen, Jülich, Kerpen, Lechenich, Weiden and Zülpich.

Its population in 1812 was 631,094.

After Napoleon's defeat in 1814 by the terms or the First Treaty of Paris ending the War of the Sixth Coalition, the department was divided between the United Kingdom of the Netherlands (left bank of the Meuse and a strip along its right bank including Gennep, Tegelen and Sittard, in present-day Dutch Limburg) and the Kingdom of Prussia (initially as the Lower Rhine General Government, later as Provinces of Jülich-Cleves-Berg and the Grand Duchy of the Lower Rhine, now parts of North Rhine-Westphalia, Germany).

== Gallery ==
Roer (red) besides other departments in the north of the French Empire, 1811

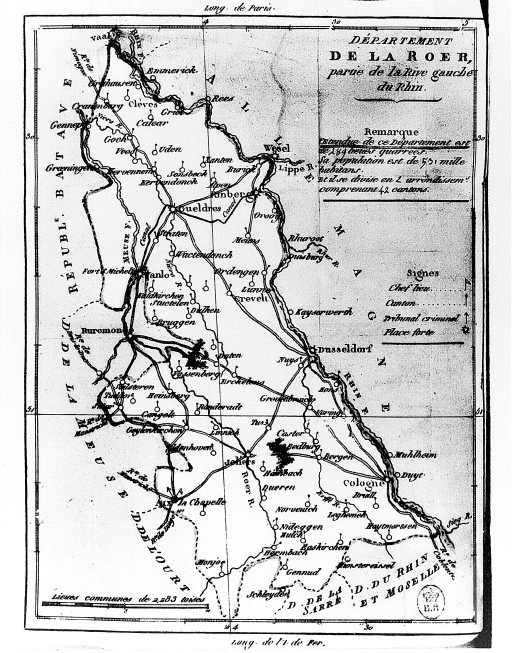
Map of the Roer departement, circa the early 1800s.

Administrative divisions
