= Regierungsbezirk =

Type of administrative division in Germany

Administrative divisions of Germany (clickable image)

Regierungsbezirke in Germany as of 28 October 2013

A Regierungsbezirk (German pronunciation: [ʁeˈɡiːʁʊŋsbəˌtsɪʁk],pl. Regierungsbezirke, German pronunciation: [ʁeˈɡiːʁʊŋsbəˌtsɪʁkə], lit. 'governmental district') is a type of administrative division in Germany. Currently, four of the sixteen Länder (states of Germany) are split into Regierungsbezirke, each in turn split into rural or urban districts.

Regierungsbezirke serve as regional mid-level local government units in four of Germany's sixteen states: Baden-Württemberg, Bavaria, Hesse and North Rhine-Westphalia, where they act as decentralised organs of the respective state government. Each of the nineteen Regierungsbezirke features a non-legislative governing body called a Regierungspräsidium (governing presidium) or Bezirksregierung (district government) headed by a Regierungspräsident (governing president), concerned mostly with administrative decisions on a local level for districts within its jurisdiction. Saxony has Direktionsbezirke (directorate districts) with more responsibilities shifted from the state parliament.

== Translations ==
Regierungsbezirk is a German term variously translated into English as "governmental district", "administrative district" or "province", with the first two being the closest literal translations.

== History ==
The first Regierungsbezirke were established in the Kingdom of Bavaria and the Kingdom of Prussia in 1808. During the course of the Prussian reforms between 1808 and 1816, Prussia subdivided its provinces into 25 Regierungsbezirke, eventually featuring 37 such districts within twelve provinces. By 1871, at the time of German unification, the concept of Regierungsbezirke had been adopted by most States of the German Empire. Similar entities were initially established in other states under different names, including Kreishauptmannschaft (district captainship) in Saxony, Kreis (district) in Bavaria and Württemberg (not to be confused with the present-day Kreis or Landkreis districts), and province in Hesse. The names of these equivalent administrative divisions were standardized to Regierungsbezirk in Nazi Germany, but after World War II these naming reforms were reverted.

The Regierungsbezirke in the state of North Rhine-Westphalia in modern Germany are in direct continuation of those created in the Prussian Rhine and Westphalia provinces in 1816. Regierungsbezirke never existed in Bremen, Hamburg, Schleswig-Holstein, and Saarland.

In 1946, Lower Saxony was founded by the merger of the three former Free States of Brunswick, Oldenburg, Schaumburg-Lippe, and the former Prussian province of Hanover. Brunswick and Oldenburg became Verwaltungsbezirke [fɛɐ̯ˈvaltʊŋsbəˌt͡sɪʁkə] (roughly administrative regions of extended competence) alongside six less autonomous Prussian-style Regierungsbezirke comprising the Province of Hanover and Schaumburg-Lippe. These differences in autonomy and size were levelled on 1 January 1978, when four Regierungsbezirke replaced the two Verwaltungsbezirke and the six Regierungsbezirke: Brunswick and Oldenburg, Aurich, Hanover (remaining mostly the same), Hildesheim, Lüneburg, Osnabrück and Stade.

Following the reunification of Germany in 1990, the territory of the former East Germany was organized into six re-established new states, including a reunified Berlin. Saxony and Saxony-Anhalt established three Regierungsbezirke each, while the other new states did not implement them.

=== 2000s disbandment and reorganization ===
During the 2000s, four German states discontinued the use of Regierungsbezirke. On 1 January 2000, Rhineland-Palatinate disbanded its three Regierungsbezirke of Koblenz, Rheinhessen-Pfalz and Trier. The employees and assets of the three Bezirksregierungen (German pronunciation: [bəˈt͡sɪʁksʁeˌɡiːʁʊŋən]) were converted into three public authorities responsible for the whole state, each covering a part of the former responsibilities of the Bezirksregierung (German: [bəˈt͡sɪʁksʁeˌɡiːʁʊŋ]).

On 1 January 2004, Saxony-Anhalt disbanded its three Regierungsbezirke of Dessau, Halle and Magdeburg. The responsibilities are now covered by a Landesverwaltungsamt (state administration office) with three offices at the former seats of the Bezirksregierungen. On 1 January 2005, Lower Saxony followed suit, disbanding its remaining four Regierungsbezirke of Brunswick, Hanover, Lüneburg, and Weser-Ems.

On 1 August 2008, Saxony restructured its Landkreise (German: [ˈlantˌkʁaɪ̯zə]), changed the name of its Regierungsbezirke to Direktionsbezirke (directorate districts), and moved some responsibilities to the districts. The Direktionsbezirke were still named "Chemnitz", "Dresden", and "Leipzig", but a border change was necessary because the new district of Mittelsachsen crossed the borders of the old Regierungsbezirke. On 1 March 2012, the Direktionsbezirke were merged into one Landesdirektion (state directorate).

== Regierungsbezirke by state ==
Currently, only four German states out of sixteen in total are divided into Regierungsbezirke; all others are directly divided into districts without mid-level agencies. Those four states are divided into a total of nineteen Regierungsbezirke, ranging in population from 1,040,000 (Gießen) to 5,244,000 (Düsseldorf).

=== Baden-Württemberg ===
Bezirk	Capital	Population (2025)	Area (km^{2})
Freiburg	Freiburg	2,325,856	9,347
Karlsruhe	Karlsruhe	2,848,413	6,919
Stuttgart	Stuttgart	4,167,550	10,156
Tübingen	Tübingen	1,904,079	8,918
Total		11,245,898	35,748

=== Bavaria ===
Bezirk	Capital	Population (2025)	Area (km^{2})
Lower Bavaria	Landshut	1,259,204	10,330
Lower Franconia	Würzburg	1,318,817	8,531
Middle Franconia	Ansbach	1,795,909	7,245
Swabia	Augsburg	1,933,313	9,992
Upper Franconia	Bayreuth	1,055,758	7,231
Upper Bavaria	Munich	4,764,548	17,530
Upper Palatinate	Regensburg	1,121,379	9,691
Total		13,248,928	70,549

=== Hesse ===
Bezirk	Capital	Population (2025)	Area (km^{2})
Darmstadt	Darmstadt	4,039,611	7,445
Gießen	Gießen	1,040,290	5,381
Kassel	Kassel	1,200,892	8,289
Total		6,280,793	21,116

=== North Rhine-Westphalia ===
Bezirk	Capital	Population (2025)	Area (km^{2})
Arnsberg	Arnsberg	3,571,898	8,002
Cologne	Cologne	4,486,282	7,365
Detmold	Detmold	2,072,861	6,518
Düsseldorf	Düsseldorf	5,244,379	5,290
Münster	Münster	2,659,034	6,905
Total		18,034,454	34,112

== List of historic former Regierungsbezirke ==
Prussia
Berlin, comprising the city and several suburbs, incorporated into Regierungsbezirk Potsdam of Brandenburg in 1822
Kleve, Province of Jülich-Cleves-Berg, incorporated into Düsseldorf region in 1822
Reichenbach, Province of Silesia, incorporated into Breslau and Liegnitz regions in 1820
Stralsund, Province of Pomerania, incorporated into Stettin Region in 1932
Dissolved in 1919/20 after cession of territory according to the Treaty of Versailles
Bromberg, Province of Posen
Danzig, Province of West Prussia (see Free City of Danzig)
Lorraine, Imperial Land of Alsace-Lorraine
Lower Alsace, Imperial Land of Alsace-Lorraine
Marienwerder, Province of West Prussia, re-established as West Prussia region of the East Prussia province in 1922
Posen, Province of Posen
Upper Alsace, Imperial Land of Alsace-Lorraine
Established after the 1939 Invasion of Poland, dissolved in 1945
Hohensalza, Reichsgau Wartheland
Kattowitz, Province of Silesia (Upper Silesia from 1941)
Litzmannstadt (Kalisch until 1941), Reichsgau Wartheland
Posen, Reichsgau Wartheland
Zichenau, Province of East Prussia
Former eastern territories, dissolved in 1945
Allenstein, Province of East Prussia
Breslau, Province of Silesia (Lower Silesia 1919–1938, 1941–1945)
Frankfurt, Province of Brandenburg
Gumbinnen, Province of East Prussia
Köslin, Province of Pomerania
Königsberg, Province of East Prussia
Liegnitz, Province of Silesia (Lower Silesia 1919–1938, 1941–1945)
Oppeln, Province of Silesia (Upper Silesia 1919–1938, 1941–1945)
Posen-West Prussia (Schneidemühl), Province of Pomerania, established in 1938
Stettin, Province of Pomerania
Allied-occupied Germany
Erfurt, dissolved in 1944/1945
Frankfurt, dissolved in 1945, Province of Brandenburg
Liegnitz, Province of Silesia, dissolved in 1945
Magdeburg, dissolved in 1945, reestablished in 1990 and redissolved in 2004
Merseburg, dissolved in 1944 or 1945
Minden, Province of Westphalia, incorporated into Detmold in 1947
Potsdam, dissolved in 1945, Province of Brandenburg
Schleswig, dissolved in 1946, Province of Schleswig-Holstein
Sigmaringen, Province of Hohenzollern, incorporated into Württemberg-Hohenzollern in 1946.
Stettin, dissolved in 1945, Province of Pomerania
