= Veluwe Quarter =

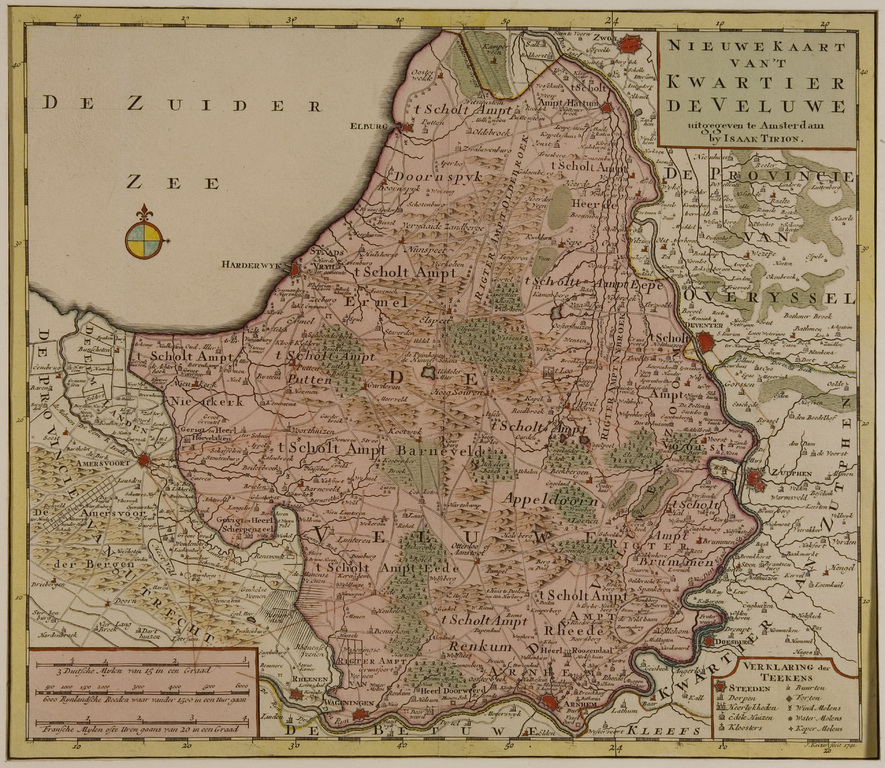
Veluwe Quarter by Isaak Tirion, 1741

Veluwe Quarter was one of the four quarters in the Duchy of Guelders, besides Quarter of Zutphen, Upper Quarter and Nijmegen Quarter. Veluwe Quarter had Arnhem as its capital and included the Veluwe area. The main cities were Elburg, Hattem, Harderwijk and Wageningen. Its location was west of the river IJssel and north of the river Rhine.
