= County of Zutphen =

Historical fief in the Netherlands

County of Zutphen Graafschap Zutphen (Dutch) Comitatus Zutphaniae (Latin)
- 1046–1581
- Coat of arms

- County of Zutphen, about 1350
- Status: Personal Union with County of Guelders (1138–1339) and Duchy of Guelders (1339–1581)
- Capital: Zutphen
- Government: Feudal monarchy
- Historical era: Middle Ages, Renaissance
  - Established: 1046
  - Disestablished: 1581
| Preceded by | Succeeded by |
| Hamaland | Burgundian Netherlands |

History of the Low Countries (Borders are imprecise)
| Frisii | | Belgae | | | | | |
| Frisii | Cana– nefates (Note: Roman foederati) | Chamavi, Tubantes (Note: The Chamavi merged into the confederation of the Franks; the Tubantes merged into the confederation of the Saxons.) | | Gallia Belgica (55 BC–c. 5th century AD); Germania Inferior (83–c. 5th century) | | | |
| Frisii | Cana– nefates | Salian Franks | | Batavi | | | |
| unpopulated (4th –c. 5th centuries) | | Saxons | Salian Franks (4th–c. 5th centuries) | | | | |
| Frisian Kingdom (c. 6th century – 734) | | Saxons | Frankish Kingdom (481–843)—Carolingian Empire (800–843) | | | | |
| Frisian Kingdom (c. 6th century – 734) | | Austrasia (511–687) | | | | | |
| Middle Francia (843–855) | | | | West; Francia (from 843) | Middle Francia (843–855) | | |
| Kingdom of Lotharingia (Note: Part of East Francia after 939, divided in Upper Lorraine (as part of West Francia) and Lower Lorraine (as part of East Francia) in 959.) (855–959); Duchy of Lower Lorraine (Note: Lower Lorraine—also referred to as Lothier—disintegrated into several smaller independent territories and only the title of a "Duke of Lothier" remained, held by Brabant.) (from 959) | | | Kingdom of Lotharingia (855–959); Duchy of Lower Lorraine (from 959) | West; Francia (from 843) | Kingdom of Lotharingia (855–959); Duchy of Lower Lorraine (from 959) | | |
| Frisia | | | Kingdom of Lotharingia (855–959); Duchy of Lower Lorraine (from 959) | County of Flanders (Note: Including County of Artois (part of Flanders until 1237) and Tournaisis.) (862–1384) | Kingdom of Lotharingia (855–959); Duchy of Lower Lorraine (from 959) | | |
| Frisian; Freedom (Note: Lordship of Frisia and Lordship of Groningen (including the Ommelanden) after 1524 and 1536 respectively.) (11th–16th centuries) | County of Holland (Note: Including County of Zeeland, that was ruled by neighboring County of Holland and County of Flanders (until 1432).) (880–1432) | Bishopric of Utrecht (Note: Utrecht included Lordship of Overijssel (until 1528), County of Drenthe (until 1528) and County of Zutphen (until 1182).) (695–1456) | Duchy of Brabant (Note: Duchy of Brabant included since 1288 also the Duchy of Limburg (now part of Belgium's Liège Province) and the "Overmaas" lands Dalhem, Valkenburg and Herzogenrath (now part of the Dutch Province of Limburg).) (1183–1430) Duchy of Guelders (Note: The county, later duchy, of Guelders consisted of four quarters, as they were separated by rivers: situated upstream Upper Quarter (the present day northern half of the Dutch province of Limburg), spatially separated from the three downstream Lower Quarters: County of Zutphen (after 1182), Veluwe Quarter and Nijmegen Quarter. The three lower quarters emerged from the historic gau Hamaland (named after the Chamavi tribe), and formed the present day province of Gelderland. Guelders did not include the Cleves enclave Huissen and the independent counties of Buren and Culemborg, that were much later seceded to the province of Gelderland.) (1046–1543) | County of Flanders (862–1384) | County of Hainaut (1071–1432) County of Namur (981–1421) | Prince- Bishopric of Liège (Note: Throughout the Middle Ages, the bishopric was further expanded with the Duchy of Bouillon in 1096 (ceded to France in 1678), the acquisition of the county of Loon in 1366 and the county of Horne in 1568. The Lordship of Mechelen was also part of the Prince-Bishopric of Liège.)(980–1791) | Duchy of Luxembourg (1059–1443) |
| Frisian; Freedom (11th–16th centuries) | Burgundian Netherlands (1384–1482) | | | | | Prince- Bishopric of Liège (980–1791) | Burgundian Netherlands (1384–1482) |
| Habsburg Netherlands (1482–1795) (Seventeen Provinces after 1543) (Note: The name Seventeen Provinces came in use after the Habsburg emperor Charles V had re-acquired the Duchy of Guelders, and an continuous territory arose.) | | | | | | Prince- Bishopric of Liège (980–1791) | Habsburg Netherlands (1482–1795) (Seventeen Provinces after 1543) |
| Dutch Republic (1581–1795) | | | | Spanish Netherlands (1556–1714) | | Prince- Bishopric of Liège (980–1791) | Spanish Netherlands (1556–1714) |
| Dutch Republic (1581–1795) | | | | Austrian Netherlands (1714–1795) | | Prince- Bishopric of Liège (980–1791) | Austrian Netherlands (1714–1795) |
| Dutch Republic (1581–1795) | | | | United States of Belgium (1790) | | Republic of Liège (1789–'91) | United States of Belgium (1790) |
| Dutch Republic (1581–1795) | | | | Austrian Netherlands (1795–1797) | | P.-Bish. of Liège (1791–1794) | Austrian Netherlands (1795–1797) |
| Batavian Republic (1795–1806); Kingdom of Holland (1806–1810) | | | associated with French First Republic (1795–1804) part of First French Empire (1804–1815) | | | | |
| part of First French Empire (1810–1813) | | | associated with French First Republic (1795–1804) part of First French Empire (1804–1815) | | | | |
| Sovereign Principality of the Netherlands (1813–1815) | | | associated with French First Republic (1795–1804) part of First French Empire (1804–1815) | | | | |
| United Kingdom of the Netherlands (1815–1830) | | | | | | | Grand Duchy of Luxembourg (from 1815) |
| Kingdom of the Netherlands (from 1839) | | | | Kingdom of Belgium (from 1830) | | | Grand Duchy of Luxembourg (from 1815) |
| Kingdom of the Netherlands (from 1839) | | | | Kingdom of Belgium (from 1830) | | | Grand Duchy of Luxembourg (from 1890) |

The County of Zutphen, located in modern-day Gelderland, a province of the Netherlands, was formed in the eleventh century as a fief of the Bishop of Utrecht. It was ruled by the Counts of Zutphen between 1046 and 1138, and then formed a personal union with Guelders. Later, it became one of the 4 quarters of Guelders. After the Act of Abjuration, the three Dutch quarters merged their representation in the Staten of Guelders and Zutphen with a joint delegation to the States General of the Netherlands, effectively ending Zutphen individuality. The name Graafschap (county) is still used for the Achterhoek, the region east of Zutphen, and for the football club De Graafschap from this region.

== Cities ==
| City | Town privileges granted | District |
|---|---|---|
| Borculo | 1375 | Heerlijkheid Borculo |
| Bredevoort | 1388 | Heerlijkheid Bredevoort |
| Bronkhorst | 1482 | Landdrostambt van Zutphen |
| Doetinchem | 1236 | Landdrostambt van Zutphen |
| Doesburg | 1237 | Richterambt van Doesburg |
| Groenlo | 1277 | Gebied van Grol |
| 's-Heerenberg | 1379 | Bannerij van 's-Heerenberg |
| Keppel | 1404 | Landdrostambt van Zutphen |
| Lichtenvoorde | unknown | Heerlijkheid Lichtenvoorde |
| Lochem | 1233 | Scholtambt van Lochem |
| Terborg | 1419 | Bannerij van Wisch |
| Zutphen | 1190 | Scholtambt van Zutphen |

- Zevenaar and some of its surroundings were, as being a part of the former Cleves Enclaves, a small district in the Duchy of Cleves.
