= Rijk van Nijmegen =

Region in the Netherlands

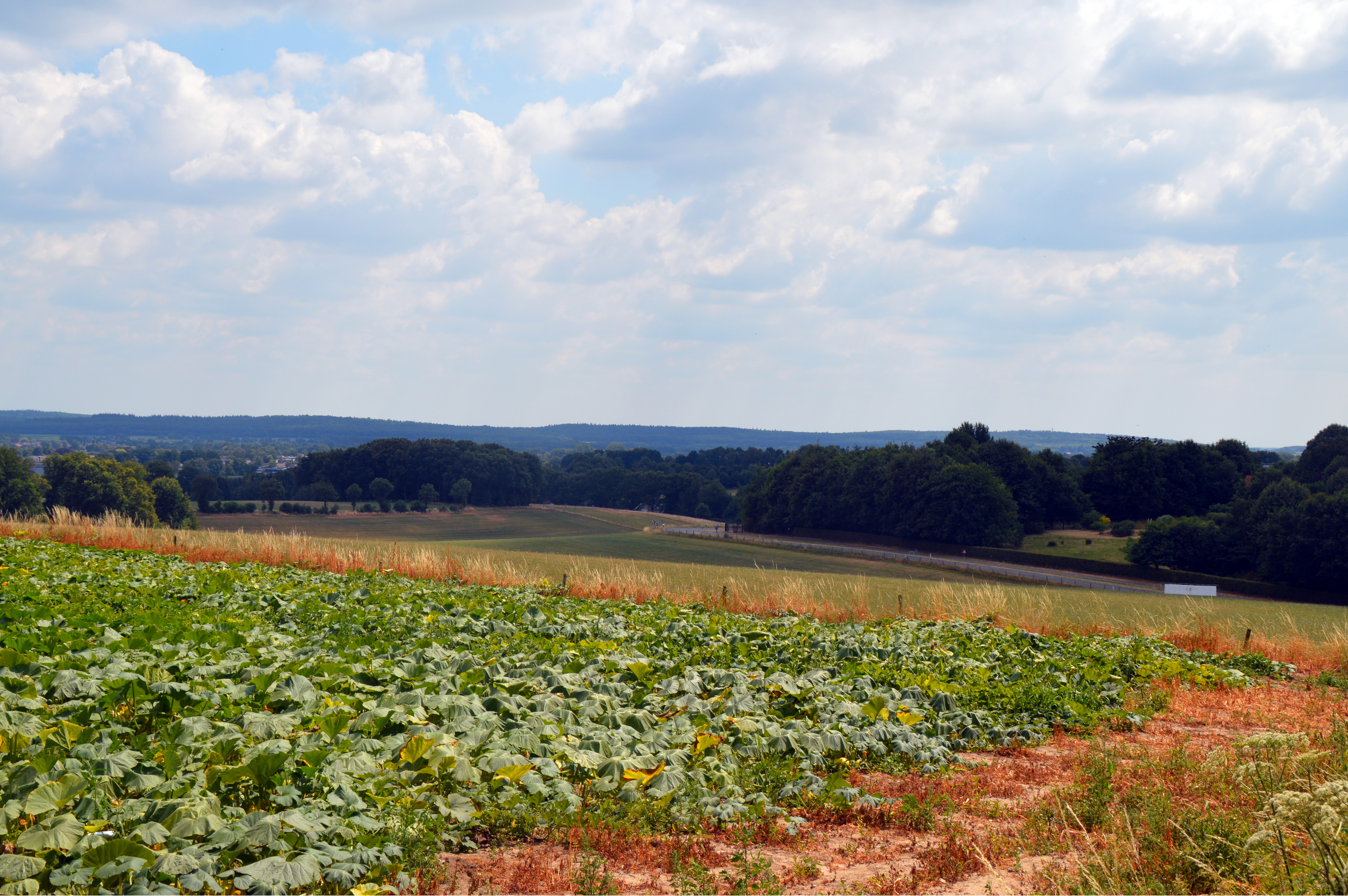
Rijk van Nijmegen

The Rijk van Nijmegen (Dutch pronunciation: [ˌrɛik fɑ ˈnɛimeːɣə(n)]) is a region in the southeast of Gelderland. The region is located around the city of Nijmegen, south of the Waal and east of the Land van Maas en Waal.

The area owes its name to the area that in earlier centuries belonged to the free imperial city of Nijmegen. In addition to Nijmegen itself, the region includes the municipalities of Beuningen, Berg en Dal, Heumen and Wijchen. The North Limburg municipality of Mook en Middelaar is often considered part of the Rijk van Nijmegen.

== Landscape ==
The region is characterized by a wide variety of landscapes. It is wide in the area of Beuningen and Wijchen. East and southeast of the city of Nijmegen it is hilly and wooded. This area is part of the cross-border Nederrijnse Heuvelrug. The highest point of this lateral moraine approaches 100 meters (Vlierenberg 99.8 m above sea level) near Berg en Dal. In the municipality of Berg en Dal lies the nature reserve Ooijpolder, which is formed by the floodplains of the river Waal.

== Governance and media ==
There is an administrative partnership, Region Rijk van Nijmegen, which has been engaged in job placement and the ICT facilities for the municipalities in the region since 2016. In addition, it serves as a "platform for cooperation and coordination between municipalities in the region" on any other topics. In addition to the aforementioned municipalities, the association also includes Druten in the Land van Maas and Waal. Due to the expansion of Nijmegen with areas north of the Waal (de Waal spring), the administrative region also extends over parts of the Over-Betuwe.

The public broadcaster RN7 broadcaster provides regional news for the Rijk van Nijmegen.

== See also ==
- The Rijk van Nijmegen, the golf club
- Nijmegen Quarter, administrative unit to which the Rijk van Nijmegen used to belong
