= Kleve (region) =

Government region in Prussia

Regierungsbezirk Kleve (or Cleves) was a Regierungsbezirk, or government region, of the Province of Jülich-Cleves-Berg in Prussia.

The creation of the administrative region was decreed on April 30, 1815; it became active on April 22, 1816. Regierungsbezirk Kleve was incorporated into Regierungsbezirk Düsseldorf on 22 June 1822.

== Administrative division ==
In 1816, the Regierungsbezirk Kleve consisted of six districts (Kreise).

== Districts ==
The Kleve region included the following districts:

- Dinslaken
- Geldern
- Kempen
- Kleve
- Rees
- Rheinberg
