= Nijmegen Quarter =

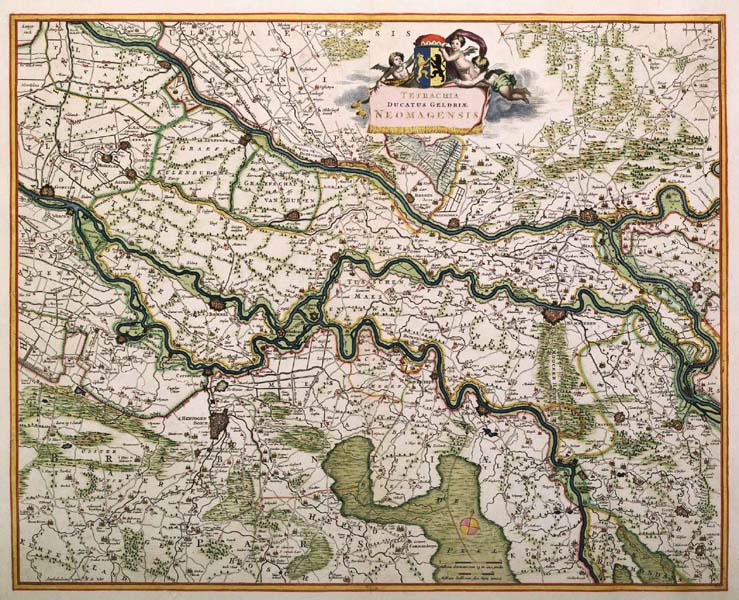
Nijmegen Quarter by Frederik de Wit, ca 1650

The Nijmegen Quarter (Dutch: Kwartier van Nijmegen) was the first of the four quarters in which the county, later Duchy of Guelders was divided, as they were separated by rivers. In addition Guelders consisted of Zutphen Quarter, the Upper Quarter and Veluwe Quarter. Each quarter had its own capital.

== Geography ==
Nijmegen Quarter, Zutphen Quarter and Veluwe Quarter are the three downstream Lower Quarters that seceded in 1581 to the Dutch Republic, and constitute the present day Dutch province of Gelderland. Nijmegen Quarter with its capital at the city of Nijmegen, included the area between the Meuse and Rhine with the exception of the Cleves enclave Huissen and the independent counties of Buren and Culemborg, that were much later seceded to the Netherlands. The quarter was divided in Nijmegen, Rijk van Nijmegen, Land of Maas and Waal, the Bommelerwaard and Betuwe. The main cities were then Nijmegen, Tiel and Zaltbommel. The quarter had a private university in Nijmegen.
