= Duchy of Guelders =

Historical state in the Low Countries

Duchy of Guelders Hertogdom Gelre (Dutch) Herzogtum Geldern (German) Duché de Gueldre (French)
- 1339–1795
- Coat of arms

- Duchy of Guelders and the County of Zutphen, about 1350
- Status: Duchy
- Capital: Geldern
- Religion: Roman Catholicism
- Government: Feudal monarchy
- Historical era: Middle Ages, Renaissance
  - Gerard I first Count of Guelders: 1096
  - Raised to duchy: 1339
  - Held by Jülich: 1393–1423
  - Acquired by Burgundy: 1473
  - Treaty of Venlo: 1543
  - Lower Quarters to Dutch Republic: 1581
  - Batavian Republic created: 1795
Preceded by	Succeeded by
Lower Lorraine	Batavian Republic

History of the Low Countries (schematic)
Frisii		Germanic tribes		Belgae & Celts			
Frisii	Cana– nefates (Note: Roman foederati)	Chamavi, Tubantes (Note: The Chamavi merged into the confederation of the Franks; the Tubantes merged into the confederation of the Saxons.)		Gallia Belgica (55 BC–c. 5th century AD); Germania Inferior (83–c. 5th century)			
Frisii	Cana– nefates	Salian Franks		Batavi			
unpopulated (4th –c. 5th centuries)		Saxons	Salian Franks (4th–c. 5th centuries)				
Frisian Kingdom (c. 6th century – 734)		Saxons	Frankish Kingdom (481–843)—Carolingian Empire (800–843)				
Frisian Kingdom (c. 6th century – 734)		Austrasia (511–687)					
Middle Francia (843–855)				West; Francia (from 843)	Middle Francia (843–855)		
Kingdom of Lotharingia (Note: Part of East Francia after 939, divided in Upper Lorraine (as part of West Francia) and Lower Lorraine (as part of East Francia) in 959.) (855–959); Duchy of Lower Lorraine (Note: Lower Lorraine—also referred to as Lothier—disintegrated into several smaller independent territories and only the title of a "Duke of Lothier" remained, held by Brabant.) (from 959)			Kingdom of Lotharingia (855–959); Duchy of Lower Lorraine (from 959)	West; Francia (from 843)	Kingdom of Lotharingia (855–959); Duchy of Lower Lorraine (from 959)		
Frisia			Kingdom of Lotharingia (855–959); Duchy of Lower Lorraine (from 959)	County of Flanders (Note: Including County of Artois (part of Flanders until 1237) and Tournaisis.) (862–1384)	Kingdom of Lotharingia (855–959); Duchy of Lower Lorraine (from 959)		
Frisian; Freedom (Note: Lordship of Frisia and Lordship of Groningen (including the Ommelanden) after 1524 and 1536 respectively.) (11th–16th centuries)	County of Holland (Note: Including County of Zeeland, that was ruled by neighboring County of Holland and County of Flanders (until 1432).) (880–1432)	Bishopric of Utrecht (Note: Utrecht included Lordship of Overijssel (until 1528), County of Drenthe (until 1528) and County of Zutphen (until 1182).) (695–1456)	Duchy of Brabant (Note: Duchy of Brabant included since 1288 also the Duchy of Limburg (now part of Belgium's Liège Province) and the "Overmaas" lands Dalhem, Valkenburg and Herzogenrath (now part of the Dutch Province of Limburg).) (1183–1430) Duchy of Guelders (Note: The county, later duchy, of Guelders consisted of four quarters, as they were separated by rivers: situated upstream Upper Quarter (the present day northern half of the Dutch province of Limburg), spatially separated from the three downstream Lower Quarters: County of Zutphen (after 1182), Veluwe Quarter and Nijmegen Quarter. The three lower quarters emerged from the historic gau Hamaland (named after the Chamavi tribe), and formed the present day province of Gelderland. Guelders did not include the Cleves enclave Huissen and the independent counties of Buren and Culemborg, that were much later seceded to the province of Gelderland.) (1046–1543)	County of Flanders (862–1384)	County of Hainaut (1071–1432) County of Namur (981–1421)	Prince- Bishopric of Liège (Note: Throughout the Middle Ages, the bishopric was further expanded with the Duchy of Bouillon in 1096 (ceded to France in 1678), the acquisition of the county of Loon in 1366 and the county of Horne in 1568. The Lordship of Mechelen was also part of the Prince-Bishopric of Liège.)(980–1791)	Duchy of Luxembourg (1059–1443)
Frisian; Freedom (11th–16th centuries)	Burgundian Netherlands (1384–1482)					Prince- Bishopric of Liège (980–1791)	Burgundian Netherlands (1384–1482)
Habsburg Netherlands (1482–1795) (Seventeen Provinces after 1543) (Note: The name Seventeen Provinces came in use after the Habsburg emperor Charles V had re-acquired the Duchy of Guelders, and an continuous territory arose.)						Prince- Bishopric of Liège (980–1791)	Habsburg Netherlands (1482–1795) (Seventeen Provinces after 1543)
Dutch Republic (1581–1795)				Spanish Netherlands (1556–1714)		Prince- Bishopric of Liège (980–1791)	Spanish Netherlands (1556–1714)
Dutch Republic (1581–1795)				Austrian Netherlands (1714–1795)		Prince- Bishopric of Liège (980–1791)	Austrian Netherlands (1714–1795)
Dutch Republic (1581–1795)				United States of Belgium (1790)		Republic of Liège (1789–'91)	United States of Belgium (1790)
Dutch Republic (1581–1795)				Austrian Netherlands (1795–1797)		P.-Bish. of Liège (1791–1794)	Austrian Netherlands (1795–1797)
Batavian Republic (1795–1806); Kingdom of Holland (1806–1810)			associated with French First Republic (1795–1804) part of First French Empire (1804–1815)				
part of First French Empire (1810–1813)			associated with French First Republic (1795–1804) part of First French Empire (1804–1815)				
Sovereign Principality of the Netherlands (1813–1815)			associated with French First Republic (1795–1804) part of First French Empire (1804–1815)				
United Kingdom of the Netherlands (1815–1830)							Grand Duchy of Luxembourg (from 1815)
Kingdom of the Netherlands (from 1839)				Kingdom of Belgium (from 1830)			Grand Duchy of Luxembourg (from 1815)
Kingdom of the Netherlands (from 1839)				Kingdom of Belgium (from 1830)			Grand Duchy of Luxembourg (from 1890)

The Duchy of Guelders (Dutch: Gelre; French: Gueldre; German: Geldern) is a historical duchy, previously county, of the Holy Roman Empire, located in the Low Countries.

== Geography ==
The duchy was named after the town of Geldern (Gelder) in present-day Germany. Though the present province of Gelderland (English also Guelders) in the Netherlands occupies most of the area, the former duchy also comprised parts of the present Dutch province of Limburg as well as those territories in the present-day German state of North Rhine-Westphalia that were acquired by Prussia in 1713, which included the duchy's capital Geldern.

Four parts of the duchy had their own centres, as rivers separated them:

- the quarter of Roermond, also called Upper Quarter or Upper Guelders – upstream on both sides of the Maas, comprising the town of Geldern as well as Erkelenz, Goch, Nieuwstadt, Venlo and Straelen;

spatially separated from the Lower Quarters (Gelderland):

- the quarter of the county Zutphen, also called the Achterhoek – east of the IJssel and north of the Rhine, including Doesburg, Doetinchem, Groenlo and Lochem;
- the Veluwe Quarter with Arnhem as its capital – west of the IJssel and north of the Rhine, with Elburg, Harderwijk, Hattem and Wageningen;
- Nijmegen Quarter, including Betuwe – south of the Rhine and north of the Maas (in between the rivers), including Gendt, Maasbommel, Tiel and Zaltbommel

== History ==
=== Wassenberg and Jülich dynasties (c.1096–1423) ===
The county emerged about 1096 when the first documented reference to Gerard III of Wassenberg as "Count of Guelders" occurred. It was then located on the territory of Lower Lorraine, in the area of Geldern and Roermond, with its main stronghold at Montfort (built 1260). Count Gerard's son Gerard II in 1127 acquired the County of Zutphen in northern Hamaland by marriage. In the 12th and 13th centuries, Guelders quickly expanded downstream along the sides of the Maas, Rhine, and IJssel rivers and even claimed the succession in the Duchy of Limburg, until it lost the 1288 Battle of Worringen against Berg and Brabant.

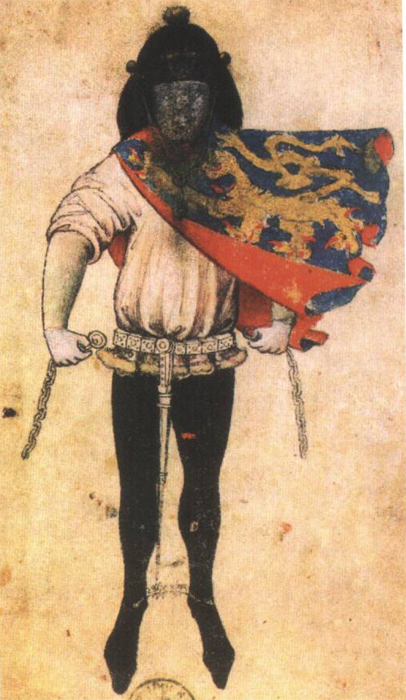
Guelders officer of arms wearing a tabard of the shield, c. 1395

Guelders was often at war with its neighbours, not only with Brabant but also with the County of Holland and the Bishopric of Utrecht. However, its territory grew not only because of its success in warfare but also because it thrived in times of peace. For example, the larger part of the Veluwe and the city of Nijmegen were given as collateral to Guelders by their cash-strapped rulers. On separate occasions, in return for loans from the treasury of Guelders, the bishop of Utrecht granted the taxation and administration of the Veluwe, and William II – Count of both Holland and Zeeland, and who was elected anti-king of the Holy Roman Empire (1248–1256) – similarly granted the same rights over Nijmegen; as neither ruler proved able to repay their debts, these lands became integral parts of Guelders.

In 1339, the Emperor Louis IV of Wittelsbach elevated Count Reginald II of Guelders (also styled Rainald), of the House of Wassenberg, to the rank of Duke. After the Wassenberg line became extinct in 1371 following the deaths of Reginald II's childless sons Edward II (on 24 August, from wounds suffered in the Battle of Baesweiler) and Reginald III (on 4 December), the ensuing Guelders War of Succession (1371 to 1379) saw William I of Jülich emerge victorious. William was confirmed in the inheritance of Guelders in 1379, and from 1393 onwards held both duchies in personal union (in Guelders as William I, and Jülich as William III).

=== Egmond and Burgundian dynasties (1423–1477) ===
In 1423, Guelders passed to the House of Egmond, which gained recognition of its title from Emperor Sigismund of Luxembourg but was unable to escape the political strife and internecine conflict that had so plagued the preceding House of Jülich-Hengebach, and more especially, the pressure brought to bear by the expansionist rulers of the Duchy of Burgundy. The first Egmond Duke, Arnold, suffered the rebellion of his son Adolf and was imprisoned by the latter in 1465. Adolf, who had enjoyed the support of Burgundian Duke Philip III ("the Good") and of the four major cities of Guelders during his rebellion, was unwilling to strike a compromise with his father when this was demanded by Philip's successor, Duke Charles the Bold. Charles had Duke Adolf captured and imprisoned in 1471 and reinstated Arnold on the throne of the Duchy of Guelders. Charles then bought the reversion (i.e., the right of succession to the throne) from Duke Arnold, who, against the will of the towns and the law of the land, pledged his duchy to Charles for 300,000 Rhenish florins. The bargain was completed in 1472–73. Upon Arnold's death in 1473, Duke Charles added Guelders to the "Low Countries" portion of his Valois Duchy of Burgundy.

=== Habsburg dynasty (1477–1549) ===
Upon Charles' defeat and death at the Battle of Nancy in January 1477, Duke Adolf was released from prison by the Flemish. Still, he died the same year at the head of a Flemish army besieging Tournai after the States of Guelders had recognized him once more as Duke. Subsequently, Guelders was ruled by Habsburg Holy Roman Emperor Maximilian I, husband of Charles the Bold's daughter and heir, Mary.

The last independent Duke of Guelders was Adolf's son Charles of Egmond (1467–1538, r. 1492–1538), who was raised at the Burgundian court of Charles the Bold and fought for the House of Habsburg in battles against the armies of Charles VIII of France until being captured in the Battle of Béthune (1487) during the War of the Public Weal (also known as the Mad War). In 1492, the citizens of Guelders, who had become disenchanted with the rule of Maximilian, ransomed Charles and recognized him as their Duke. Charles, now backed by France, fought Maximilian's grandson Charles of Habsburg (who became Holy Roman Emperor, as Charles V, in 1519) in the Guelders Wars and expanded his realm further north, to incorporate what is now the Province of Overijssel. He was not simply a man of war but also a skilled diplomat and was, therefore, able to keep his independence. He bequeathed the duchy to Duke William the Rich of Jülich-Cleves-Berg (also known as Wilhelm of Cleves). Following in the footsteps of Charles of Egmond, Duke William formed an alliance with France, an alliance dubiously cemented via his political marriage to French King Francis I's niece Jeanne d'Albret (who reportedly had to be whipped into submission to the marriage, and later bodily carried to the altar by the Constable of France, Anne de Montmorency). This alliance emboldened William to challenge Emperor Charles V's claim to Guelders, but the French, mightily engaged on multiple fronts as they were in the long struggle to against the Habsburg "encirclement" of France, proved less reliable than the Duke's ambitions required, and he was unable to hold on to the duchy; in 1543, by the terms of the Treaty of Venlo, Duke William conceded the Duchy of Guelders to the Emperor.

=== Part of the Seventeen Provinces ===
Emperor Charles V united Guelders with the Seventeen Provinces of the Habsburg Netherlands by the Pragmatic Sanction of 1549, and Guelders thus lost its independence.

Charles abdicated in 1556 and decreed that the territories of the Burgundian Circle should be held by the Spanish Crown. When the Netherlands revolted against King Philip II of Spain in the Dutch Revolt, the three northern quarters of Gelderland joined the Union of Utrecht and became part of the United Provinces upon the 1581 Act of Abjuration, while only the Upper Quarter remained a part of the Spanish Netherlands.

At the Treaty of Utrecht, ending the War of the Spanish Succession in 1713, the Spanish Upper Quarter was again divided between Prussian Guelders (Geldern, Viersen, Horst, Venray), the United Provinces (Venlo, Montfort, Echt), Austria (this part continued as the duchy: Roermond, Niederkrüchten, Weert), and the Duchy of Jülich (Erkelenz). In 1795, Guelders was finally conquered and incorporated by the French First Republic and partitioned between the départements of Roer and Meuse-Inférieure.

== Coat of arms of Guelders ==
The coat of arms of the region changed over time.

before 1236

from 1236

from 1276

Jülich-Guelders after 1393

== Guelders in popular culture ==
William Thatcher, the lead character in the 2001 film A Knight's Tale played by Heath Ledger, claimed to be Sir Ulrich von Liechtenstein from Gelderland to appear to be of noble birth and thus qualify to participate in jousting.

Set in the late 1460s, the main character in Rafael Sabatini's 1929 novel The Romantic Prince is Count Anthony of Guelders, elder son of Duke Arnold and brother to Adolf "since then happily vanished". Sabatini weaves the historical characters and events of the period through the story.

Folk metal band Heidevolk, based in Gelderland, composed and performs a range of songs about the history of Gelre/Guelders. Their song Gelre 838, Wychaert is about the legend of the dragon of Guelders, while Karel van Egmond, Hertog van Gelre is about the reign of Charles II, Duke of Guelders. They have also covered the Geldersch Volkslied, the contemporary anthem of the province of Gelderland written by Jan van Riemsdijk.

== See also ==
- Prussian Guelders
- Spanish Guelders
