= Düsseldorf (region) =

Coordinates: 51°25′N 6°40′E

- Regierungsbezirk
- Map of North Rhine-Westphalia highlighting Düsseldorf
- Country: Germany
- State: North Rhine-Westphalia
- Region seat: Düsseldorf

Government
  - District President: Thomas Schürmann (Greens)

Area
  - Total: 5,289.81 km^{2} (2,042.41 sq mi)

Population (31 December 2025)
  - Total: 5,231,178
  - Density: 988.916/km^{2} (2,561.28/sq mi)

GDP
  - Total: €271.328 billion (2024)
  - Per capita: €51,741 (2024)
- Website: bezreg-duesseldorf.nrw.de

Düsseldorf is one of the five Regierungsbezirke of North Rhine-Westphalia, Germany, located in the north-west of the country. It covers the western part of the Ruhr Area, as well as the Niederrheinische Tiefebene, the lower Rhine area. It is the most populated of all German administrative areas of the kind. It is the only area in Germany where the traditional dialects are Low Franconian, rather than Low German or High German.

It was created as a subdivision of the Prussian Rhineland when Prussia reformed its internal administration in 1815. In 1822 the Regierungsbezirk Kleve was incorporated into Regierungbezirk Düsseldorf.

Its highest point is the Brodtberg (378 m).

Kreise
(districts)
1. Kleve (Cleves)
2. Mettmann
3. Neuss
4. Viersen
5. Wesel
Kreisfreie Städte
(district-free towns)
1. Duisburg
2. Düsseldorf
3. Essen
4. Krefeld
5. Mönchengladbach
6. Mülheim
7. Oberhausen
8. Remscheid
9. Solingen
10. Wuppertal

== Economy ==
The Gross domestic product (GDP) of the region was 215.7 billion € in 2018, accounting for 6.4% of German economic output. GDP per capita adjusted for purchasing power was €38,100 or 126% of the EU27 average in the same year. The GDP per employee was 108% of the EU average.

The region is served by Düsseldorf Airport. The airport is Germany's fourth-busiest airport and handled over 20 million passengers in 2024. Other airports such as Cologne Bonn Airport, and Dortmund Airport are also used by air travellers from the region.
