= Trier (region) =

Coordinates: 49°46′36″N 06°38′00″E

Trier Regierungsbezirk Trier
- Regierungsbezirk
- Regierungsbezirk Trier (1974-1999) in Rhineland-Palatinate
- Country: Germany
- State: Rhineland-Palatinate
- Disestablished: 2000-01-01
- Region seat: Trier

Area
  - Total: 4,922.46 km^{2} (1,900.57 sq mi)

Population
  - Total: 512,990
  - Density: 104.21/km^{2} (269.91/sq mi)

GDP
  - Total: €17.741 billion (2021)

Trier was one of the three Regierungsbezirke of Rhineland-Palatinate, Germany, located in the west of the state.

== History ==
The region was created in 1815 as part of the Prussian Rhineland. Until 1920 the bulk of what then became the Territory of Saar Basin was part of the Trier Region. Only the east of the Saar Territory, today's Saar-Palatinate district, formerly the western fringes of the then Bavarian Rhenish Palatinate, was previously no part of the Trier Region. In April 1937 the St. Wendel-Baumholder district, formed in 1920 from those parts of the St. Wendel district that had not been seceded to the Saar Territory, was dissected from the Trier Region and merged in the new Birkenfeld district within the Koblenz Region.

After the Second World War the French military government several times extended the Saar area before forming the Saar Protectorate, also including additional 109 municipalities belonging until July 1946 to the Trier Region and some to the Koblenz Region. Koblenz Region's former areas make up part of today's St. Wendel district in the Saarland. In December 1946, when a new customs boundary dissected the Saar Protectorate (later becoming the Saarland) from the area under the Allied Control Council over Allied-occupied Germany, the Trier Region with its then remaining territory had become one of the then five regions forming the new state of Rhineland-Palatinate, founded in August 1946. Later, the French occupation government again redeployed some municipalities – some returned to Allied-occupied Germany, some newly annexed to the protectorate – between the Saar area and the new state of Rhineland-Palatinate in 1947 and 1949, before the border was finally fixed.

Since 2000, the employees and assets of the Bezirksregierungen (i.e. regional administrations) form the Aufsichts- und Dienstleistungsdirektion Trier (ADD; Supervisory and Service Directorate Trier) and the Struktur- und Genehmigungsdirektionen (SGD; Structural and Approval Directorates) Nord in Koblenz and Süd in Neustadt (Weinstraße). These administrations execute their authority over the whole state, i. e. the ADD Trier oversees all schools.

Kreise
(districts)

1. Bernkastel-Wittlich
2. Bitburg-Prüm
3. Vulkaneifel
4. Trier-Saarburg

Kreisfreie Städte
(district-free towns)

1. Trier
