= Prussian Guelders =

Prussian Guelders or Prussian G(u)elderland (Dutch: Pruisisch Gelre; German: Preußisch Geldern) was the part of the Duchy of Guelders ruled by the Kingdom of Prussia from 1713. Its capital was Geldern.

The Upper Quarter of the Duchy of Guelders was part of the Spanish-ruled Southern Netherlands by the end of the 17th century. In the 1713 Treaty of Utrecht during the War of the Spanish Succession, the Upper Quarter was partitioned between the Dutch Republic, Austria, and Prussia. Besides Geldern, other towns in the Prussian duchy were Horst, Venray, and Viersen, the latter of which was an exclave surrounded by the Duchy of Jülich. Prussian Guelders was part of the Lower Rhenish-Westphalian Circle within the Holy Roman Empire.

Prussian Guelders was occupied by Revolutionary France in 1794 and later annexed into the First French Empire as part of the Roer Department. After the Napoleonic Wars, the western regions became part of the Kingdom of the Netherlands, while the eastern regions, such as Geldern and Viersen, were made part of the new Prussian province of Jülich-Cleves-Berg. These latter regions, until then linguistically and culturally Dutch, rapidly became Germanized.
