= Free Imperial City of Aachen =

Free Imperial City of the Holy Roman Empire (1166–1801)

Free Imperial City of Aachen/Aix-la-Chapelle Freie Reichsstadt Aachen (German)
- 1166–1797
- Flag Coat of arms

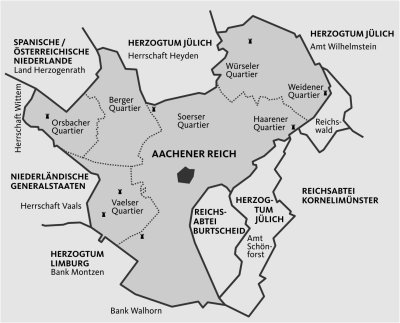
- Free Imperial City of Aachen
- Status: Free Imperial City (State of the Holy Roman Empire)
- Capital: Aachen
- Government: Administrative republic
- Historical era: Middle Ages
  - Settlement founded: ca sixth millennium BC
  - Gained Imp. immediacy: 1166
  - Fire devastated city: 1656
  - 1st Treaty ended War of Devolution: 2 May 1668
  - 2nd Treaty ended War of Austr. Succession: April – May 1748
  - Annexed by France: 1797
  - to Kingdom of Prussia: 1815
Preceded by	Succeeded by
Lower Lotharingia; County of Jülich	Roer (department); Cisrhenian Republic
- Today part of: Germany

The Free Imperial City of Aachen, also known in English by its French name of Aix-la-Chapelle and today known simply as Aachen, was a Free Imperial City and spa of the Holy Roman Empire west of Cologne and southeast of the Low Countries, in the Lower Rhenish–Westphalian Circle. The pilgrimages, the Coronation of the Holy Roman Emperor, flourishing industries and the privileges conferred by various emperors made it one of the most prosperous market towns of the Holy Roman Empire.

== History ==
In 1166, Aachen was given imperial immediacy and declared a Free Imperial City of the Holy Roman Empire by Emperor Frederick I, also known as Barbarossa, by means of the Charlemagne Privilege (Karlsprivileg). Emperor Friedrich II also confirmed the imperial immediacy of the city of Aachen. Aachen played a part in the league which kept the peace between 1351 and 1387 between the Meuse and the Rhine. In 1450 a rebellion led to the acceptance of the guilds to a share in local government. In the 16th century Aachen began declining in importance and prosperity. It was too close to the frontier with the Kingdom of France to be safe, and too far from the Holy Roman Empire to be convenient as a capital city. In 1562 the Imperial election and Coronation of the Holy Roman Emperor Maximilian II took place at Frankfurt, a precedent followed until the end of the Holy Roman Empire. The Protestant Reformation brought trouble to Aachen. In 1580 Protestantism got the upper hand; an Imperial ban resulted and was imposed in 1598 by Ernest of Bavaria, archbishop-elector of Cologne. A religious relapse of the city led to a new Imperial ban by Emperor Matthias in 1613, and in 1614 Ambrogio Spinola's Spanish Army forced the recalcitrant city back into the Catholic fold. In 1656 a great fire destroyed 4,000 houses. This calamity completed the ruin started by the Thirty Years' War.

Aachen hosted several peace conferences, those ending the War of Devolution and the War of the Austrian Succession. By the Treaty of Aix-la-Chapelle, dated 2 May 1668, Louis XIV of France was compelled, by the Triple Alliance between Kingdom of England, the Dutch Republic, and the Kingdom of Sweden, to abandon the War of Devolution against Southern Netherlands. The treaty forced the King to restore the County of Burgundy, which he had conquered, and to be content with owning twelve Flemish fortifications. The second Treaty of Aix-la-Chapelle, dated 18 October 1748, ended the War of the Austrian Succession. While the Flanders Campaign Aachen was conquered by France 22 September 1794. The projected Cisrhenian Republic was not realized. By the terms of the Treaty of Campo Formio, Aachen was incorporated in the French First Republic as chief town in the Roer Department. Later, the Congress of Vienna gave Aachen to the Kingdom of Prussia.

== See also ==
- Timeline of Aachen
