= Grand Duchy of the Lower Rhine =

Historical province of the Kingdom of Prussia

Grand Duchy of the Lower Rhine Großherzogtum Niederrhein
- Province of Kingdom of Prussia
- 1815–1822
- The Lower Rhine Province (red), within the Kingdom of Prussia (blue), within the German Confederation (member states in tan)
- Capital: Koblenz
- Area
  - Coordinates: 50°22′N 7°36′E
- Population
  - 1816: 951,998
  - 1822: 1,042,724
- History
  - Established: 1815
  - Disestablished: 1822
- Political subdivisions: Aachen; Koblenz; Trier
Preceded by
Electorate of Trier
Manderscheid
Malmedy
Free Imperial City of Aachen
Palatinate
Luxembourg
Duchy of Limburg
Succeeded by
Rhine Province
- Today part of: North Rhine-Westphalia; Rhineland-Palatinate; Hesse; Saarland; Eupen-Malmedy

The Grand Duchy of the Lower Rhine (German: Großherzogtum Niederrhein), or simply known as the Lower Rhine Province (Provinz Niederrhein), was a province of the Kingdom of Prussia and existed from 1815 to 1822. It was formally incorporated into the Prussian state on 5 April 1815.

== History ==
Because of First Paris Treaty 1814, the Kingdom of France lost territories left of Rhine that formerly belonged to Holy Roman Empire. The Kingdom of Prussia annexed parts of these territories.

The province was created after the Congress of Vienna in 1815, where Frederick William III was given the Rhineland and with it the title of Grand Duke of the Lower Rhine. This allowed Prussia to consolidate its Rhenish territories held since 1803, such as the Electorate of Trier, County of Manderscheid, Principality of Stavelot-Malmedy, the previously Free Imperial City of Aachen, parts of Luxembourg and Limburg, as well as a few other small territories.

Prussia was divided in ten provinces by Verordnung wegen verbesserter Einrichtung der Provinzial-Behörden. Vom 30sten April 1815. ("Decree concerning the improved organization of the provincial authorities. Dated April 30, 1815").

On 22 April 1816, these territories were combined to form the Grand Duchy of the Lower Rhine, with the provincial capital situated in Koblenz.

On 27 June 1822, by order of the Prussian cabinet, this province was fused with the neighbouring (lower) Province of Jülich-Cleves-Berg to form the Rhine Province, of which the former duchy was the upper part.

== Government ==
The Grand Duchy of the Lower Rhine became a province of the Kingdom of Prussia under King Frederick William III of Prussia.

The head of Prussian provinces was called the Oberpräsident (compare the decree 30th April 1815), which means "President of higher government". He was directly subordinate to the king. The office of the Oberpräsident was held by Johann August Sack and Karl von Ingersleben.

The Prussian provinces further were divided in Regierungs-Bezirke (government district), with Präsident (district president) as Administrator.

The districts of the Lower Rhine Province were:

- Koblenz
- Trier
- Aachen, since "Second Paris Treaty", before it had been administered as Generalgouvernment.
