= Cisrhenian Republic =

Proposed French client state in 1797

Coordinates: 50°56′11″N 6°57′10″E

Cisrhenian Republic Cisrhenanische Republik
- 1797–1801
- Flag

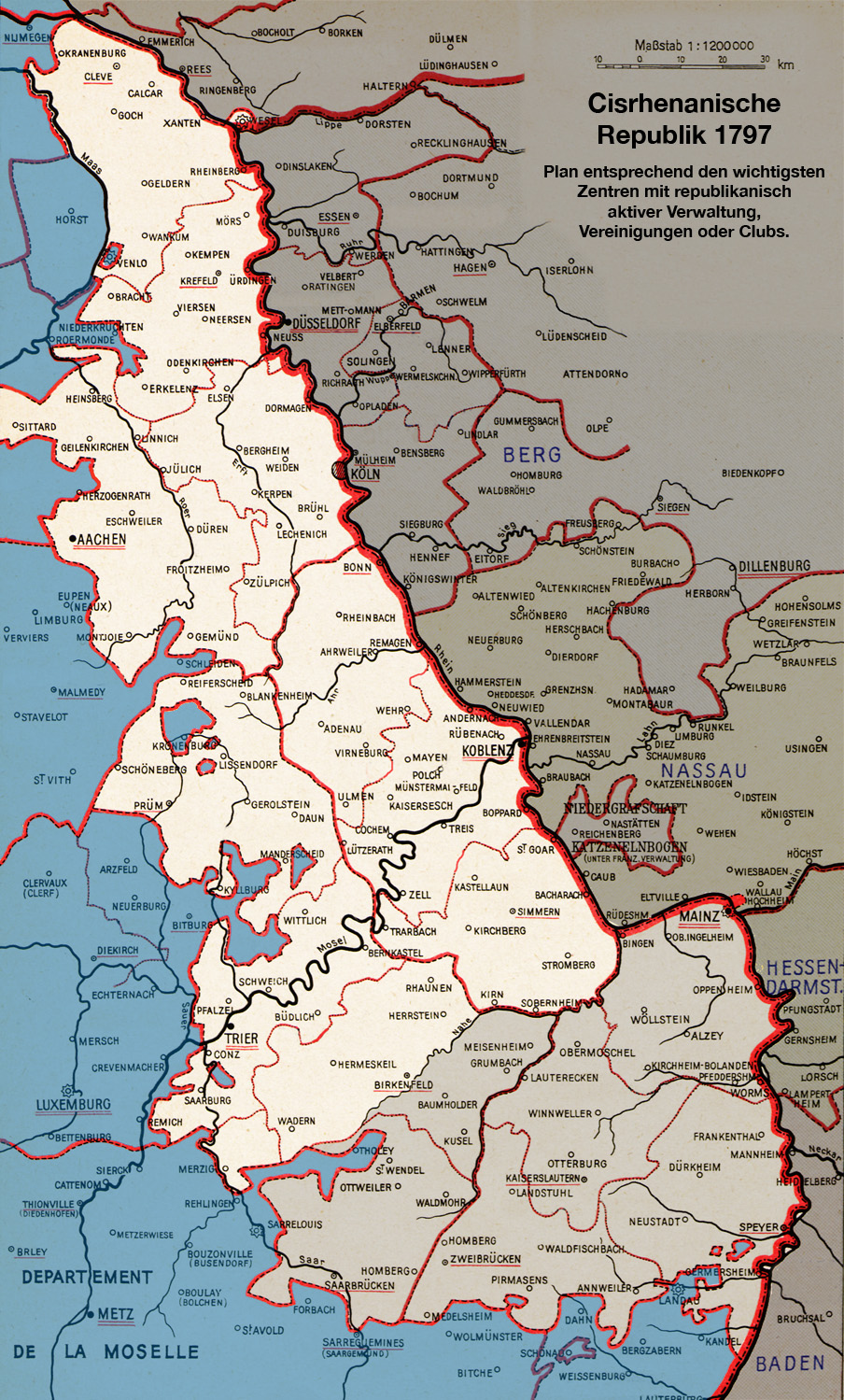
- Status: Sister republic
- Capital: Cologne
- Common languages: Rhine Franconian
- Government: Revolutionary republic
- Historical era: French Revolutionary Wars
  - Campaign of the French Revolutionary Wars: 1797
  - Peace of Leoben: April 1797
  - Coup of 18 Fructidor: September 1797
  - Treaty of Campo Formio: October 1797
  - Treaty of Lunéville: 9 February 1801
  - Congress of Vienna: 1815
Preceded by
Holy Roman Empire
Succeeded by
Mont-Tonnerre
Rhin-et-Moselle
Roer
Sarre
- Today part of: Belgium; Germany; Netherlands
- 2. ...

The Cisrhenian Republic (German: Cisrhenanische Republik; French: République cisrhénane) was a proposed client state of France during the French Revolutionary Wars in 1797. It was intended to be established on the Left Bank of the Rhine which was under French occupation at the time. However, the Coup of 18 Fructidor in the same year led to a shift in policy, ultimately resulting in the direct annexation of the territory instead.
