= Koblenz (region) =

Coordinates: 50°22′N 7°36′E

- Regierungsbezirk
- Regierungsbezirk Koblenz (1974–1999) in Rhineland-Palatinate
- Country: Germany
- State: Rhineland-Palatinate
- Disestablished: 2000-01-01
- Region seat: Koblenz

Area
  - Total: 8,076.21 km^{2} (3,118.24 sq mi)

Population (2001)
  - Total: 1,524,695
  - Density: 188.788/km^{2} (488.960/sq mi)

GDP
  - Total: €55.229 billion (2021)

Koblenz was one of the - at last - three Regierungsbezirke of Rhineland-Palatinate, Germany, located in the north-east of the state.

The region was created in 1815 as part of the Prussian Rhineland, becoming part of the new state of Rhineland-Palatinate in 1946. In 1968 the neighbouring Montabaur Region was dissolved and its territory annexed to Koblenz Region.

Since 2000, the employees and assets of the Bezirksregierungen form the Aufsichts- und Dienstleistungsdirektion Trier (Supervisory and Service Directorate Trier) and the Struktur- und Genehmigungsdirektionen (Structural and Approval Directorates) Nord in Koblenz and Süd in Neustadt (Weinstraße). These administrations execute their authority over the whole state, i. e. the ADD Trier oversees all schools.

Kreise
(districts)

1. Ahrweiler
2. Altenkirchen
3. Bad Kreuznach
4. Birkenfeld
5. Cochem-Zell
6. Mayen-Koblenz
7. Neuwied
8. Rhein-Hunsrück
9. Rhein-Lahn
10. Westerwaldkreis

Kreisfreie Städte
(district-free towns)

1. Koblenz
