= Province of Jülich-Cleves-Berg =

Province of Prussia (1815–1822)

Province of Jülich-Cleves-Berg Provinz Jülich-Kleve-Berg (German)
- Province of Prussia
- 1815–1822
- The province of Jülich-Cleves-Berg (red), within the Kingdom of Prussia (dark blue), within the German Confederation (tan)
- Capital: Cologne
- Area
  - Coordinates: 50°57′N 6°58′E
- Population
  - 1816: 923,387
  - 1821: 1,028,834
  - Type: Province
- Historical era: Early modern period
  - Provinces re-organised: 30 April 1815
  - Congress of Vienna: 18 June 1815
  - United with Lower Rhine: 22 June 1822
- Political subdivisions: Cologne; Düsseldorf; Kleve
Preceded by	Succeeded by
First French Empire; Grand Duchy of Berg	Rhine Province

The Province of Jülich-Cleves-Berg (German: Provinz Jülich-Kleve-Berg) was a province of Prussia from 1815 to 1822. Jülich-Cleves-Berg was established in 1815 from part restored and part newly annexed lands by the Kingdom of Prussia from France's Grand Duchy of Berg. Jülich-Cleves-Berg was dissolved in 1822 when it was merged with the Grand Duchy of the Lower Rhine to form Rhine Province. Cologne was the provincial capital.

== History ==
After the Napoleonic Wars, the Congress of Vienna restored the Duchy of Cleves to the Kingdom of Prussia, which combined them with the other Rhenish lands restored from France (Prussian Guelders and the Principality of Moers) with the Rhenish lands gained at Vienna—the old Duchy of Jülich and County of Berg along with parts of the Electorate of Cologne and the Free and Hanseatic City of Cologne and some other smaller territories.

On 30 April 1815, Prussian authorities reorganised the states of the kingdom into 10 provinces with the Verordnung wegen verbesserter Einrichtung der Provinzialbehörden (English: Regulation for the establishment of improved provincial authorities), of which Jülich-Cleves-Berg was one. The province's name was a reference to the United Duchies of Jülich-Cleves-Berg, a former territory of the Holy Roman Empire which contained most of the land.

The provincial government was headquartered in Cologne, with the province subdivided into Regierungsbezirke (districts) of Düsseldorf, Cleves and Cologne from 22 April 1816. The provincial president was Frederick, Count of Solms-Laubach.

On 22 June 1822, an order of the Prussian cabinet (German: Kabinettsordre) united the province with the Grand Duchy of the Lower Rhine province, with its capital in Koblenz, to form the Rhine Province.

== See also ==
- United Duchies of Jülich-Cleves-Berg
