= List of 18th-century women artists =

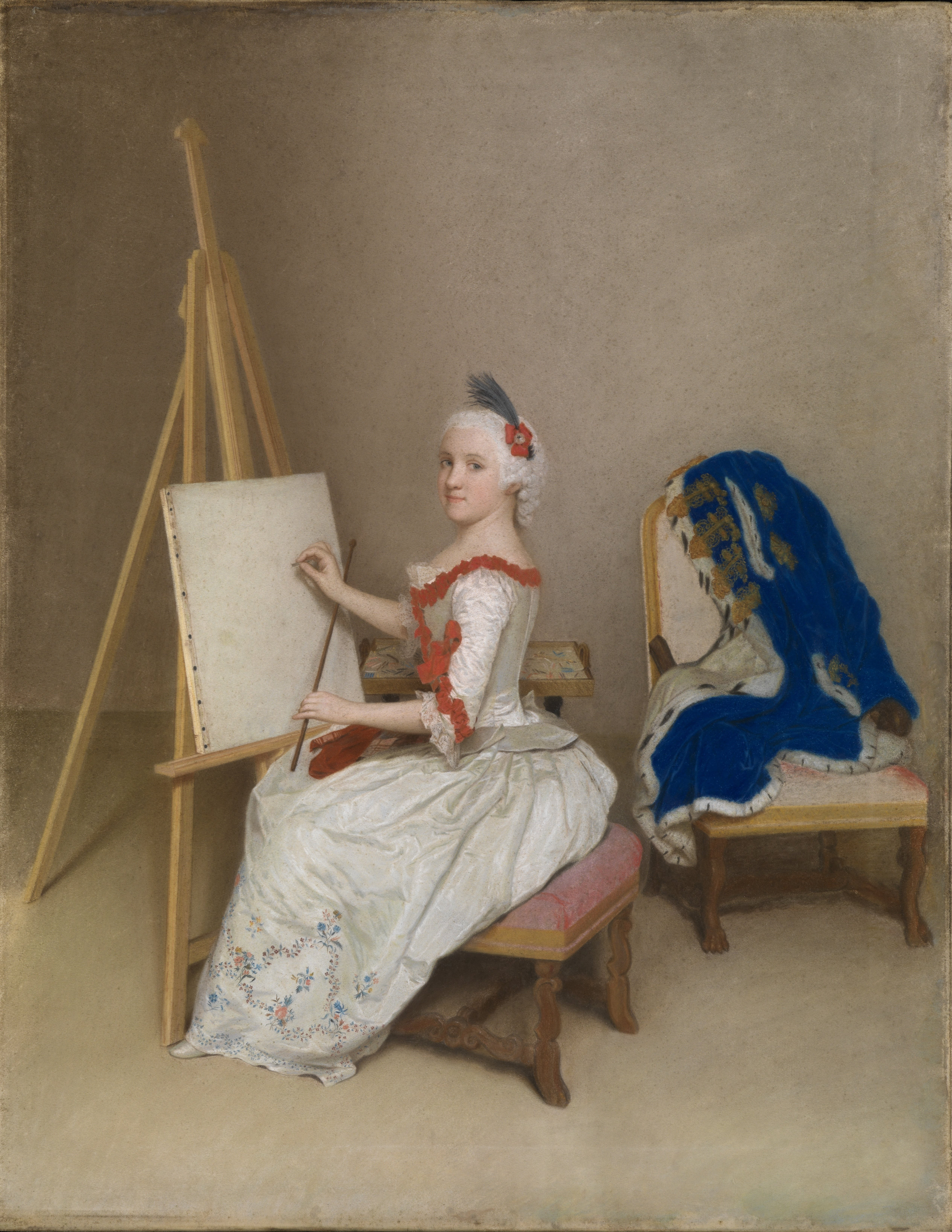
Karoline Hessen-Darmstadt by Liotard

18th-century women artists – female painters, miniaturists, calligraphers, engravers and sculptors who were active in 18th century (born between 1680 and 1800).

== Asia ==
=== China ===
- Lin Yining (1655 – c. 1730) – poet and painter
- Chen Shu (1660–1735) – first female painter of Qing dynasty, painter's daughter.
- Ma Quan (18th C) - flower and bird painter
- Yun Bing (18th C) - flower and bird painter
- Fang Wanyi (1732-1779) - poet and painter
- Yun Zhu (1771-1833) - poet, painter, anthologist

=== India ===
- Begum Samru (c. 1753-1836)

=== Japan ===
- Ike Gyokuran (1727-1784) - painter and calligrapher
- Seiyodo Bunshojo (1764–1838) - netsuke carver

== Americas ==
Category:18th-century American women artists
Category:18th-century Canadian women artists

- Isabel de Santiago (1666 – c. 1714) – Criollo colonial painter born in the colony of Quito (Ecuador), daughter of painter Miguel de Santiago.
- Jeanne-Charlotte Allamand (1760-1839) - Swiss-born Canadian artist
- Mary Roberts (painter) (d. 1761) - American miniaturist
- Hetty Benbridge (d. 1776) - American miniaturist
- Patience Wright (1725–1786) - American wax sculptor
- Alethea Stiles (1745-1781) - American needleworker
- Sarah Furman Warner Williams (1764–1848) - American embroiderer and quiltmaker.
- Eunice Pinney (1770-1849) - American Folk Artist
- Sarah Bushnell Perkins (1771–1831) - American pastelist
- Lydia Byam (1772-1854) - British botanical illustrator, slaveowner in Antigua.

== Europe ==
=== Austria ===
- Archduchess Maria Anna of Austria (1738 -1789)
- Barbara Krafft (1764-1825)

=== Belgium ===
- Marie de Latour (1750–1834) – painter and engraver, daughter of painter Jan Baptist Simons.
- Marie-Elisabeth Simons (1754–1774) – painter and miniaturist.
- Marianne de Bellem (1767–1798) – revolutionary and pastellist.

=== Denmark ===
Category:18th-century Danish women artists

=== France ===
Category:18th-century French women artists

Born in 17th-century:

- Geneviève Boullogne (1645–1708) – daughter of painter Louis de Boullogne. Member of Academia.
- Madeleine Boullogne (1646–1710) – daughter of painter Louis de Boullogne. Member of Academia.
- Elisabeth Sophie Cheron (1648–1711) – poet, painter, member of Academia. Daughter of painter Henri Chéron
- Marie Courtois (c. 1655 – 1703) – miniature painter
- Marie-Geneviève Hérault – (c. 1655 – c. 1712)

Born in 18th-century:

- Francoise Duparc (1705-1778)
- Marianne Loir (1715-1769)
- Marie-Genevieve Navarre (1737-1795)
- Anne Vallayer-Coster (1744-1818) - Academic
- Marie-Anne Fragonard (1745-1823) - wife of the painter Jean-Honoré Fragonard
- Marie-Anne Collot (1748-1821) - sculptor, daughter-in-law of Étienne Falconet. Member of Russian Academia
- Antoinette Louise Demarcy (1788–1859), miniature painter
- Adélaïde Labille-Guiard (1749 – 1803) - Academic
- Marie-Victoire Lemoine (1754-1820)
- Élisabeth Louise Vigée Le Brun (1755 – 1842) - Academic
- Marie-Élisabeth Gabiou (c. 1761 – 1811) - sister of Marie-Victoire Lemoine
- Rose Adelaide Ducreux (1761-1802) - daughter of painter Joseph Ducreux
- Marguerite Gerard (1761-1837)
- Marie-Guillemine Benoist (1768-1726)
- Marie-Denise Villers (1774-1821) - sister of Marie-Victoire Lemoine
- Jeanne-Elisabeth Chaudet (d. 1832) - cousin of Marie-Victoire Lemoine
- Anne Allen (1760) - Printmaker

=== Germany ===
Category:18th-century German women artists

Born in 17th-century:

- Anna Katharina Block (1642–1719) – daughter of the flower painter Johann Thomas Fischer, taught the Duchess Anna Maria of Mecklenburg-Schwerin and her daughters
- Maria Sibylla Merian (1647–1717) – entomologist, naturalist and scientific illustrator.
- Johanna Sibylla Küsel (1650–1717) – engraver, daughter of painter Melchior Küsel.
- Amalia von Königsmarck (1663–1740) – noblewoman, dilettante
- Magdalena Fürstin (1652–1717) – hand-colourist.
- Johanna Helena Herolt (1668-after 1723) – botanical artist, daughter of the painters Maria Sibylla Merian and Johann Andreas Graff.
- Dorothea Maria Graff (1678–1743) – daughter of the painters Maria Sibylla Merian and Johann Andreas Graff.

Born in 18th-century:

- Anna Rosina Lisiewski (de Gasc) (1713-1783) - daughter of painter Georg Lisiewski
- Anna Dorothea Therbusch (1721-1782) - daughter of painter Georg Lisiewski
- Therese Concordia Maron (Mengs) (1725-1806) - daughter of painter Ismael Mengs, miniaturist and pastel painter.
- Anna Maria Mengs (1751-1792) - daughter of the painter Anton Raphael Mengs. Lived and worked in Spain.
- Apollonia Seydelmann (1767/68 - 1840) - German-Italian miniaturist.

=== Italy ===
Category:18th-century Italian women artists

Born in 17th century:

- Plautilla Bricci (1616–1705) – architect, painter and sculptor; she was the only female architect of her day
- Anna Maria Sirani (1645–1715). Daughter of painter Giovanni Andrea Sirani.
- Teresa del Pò (1649–1716) – daughter of painter Pietro del Pò.
- Margherita Caffi (1650–1710) – painter of still lifes of flowers and fruit, member of artistic family
- Maria Vittoria Cassana (died 1711) – daughter of painter Giovanni Francesco Cassana.
- Elena Recco (c. 1654 – 1715) – daughter of the still-life painter Giuseppe Recco, worked at the Spanish court.
- Maria Cattarina Locatelli (died 1723) – member of artistic family
- Angiola Teresa Moratori Scanabecchi (1662 –1708)
- Giovanna Fratellini (Marmocchini Cortesi) (1666–1731) – court painter and teacher
- Maria Elena Panzacchi (1668–1737)
- Rosalba Carriera (1673–1757) – miniaturist and pastel painter
- Giovana Carriera (1675–1737) – sister of Rosalba
- Angela Carriera (1677–1760) – sister of Rosalba
- Lucia Casalini Torelli (1677–1762) - wife of painter Felice Torelli
- Faustina Maratti (c. 1679 – 1745) – poet and painter, natural daughter of the painter Carlo Maratta
- Giulia Lama (1681–1747)
- Maria Giovanna Clementi (1692-1761)

Born in 18th century:

- Eleonora Bargili (?) – nun
- Teresa Berenice Vitelli, Suor Veronica, (active 1706 – 1729) - nun
- Celeste Tanfani (active between 1735 and 1737)
- Margarita Gabassi (active mid-18th-century)
- Luigia Maria Rosa Alboni (d. 1759) - daughter of painter Paolo Alboni
- Carlotta Amigoni - sister of Jacopo Amigoni.
- Caterina Amigoni Castellini - Italian pastellist living in Spain, daughter of painter Jacopo Amigoni. Her sister signora Belluomini was also painter.
- Marianna Carlevarijs (1703 – 1750) - daughter of painter Luca Carlevarijs.
- Maria Felice Tibaldi (1707–1770) - portrait painter, wife of Pierre Subleyras. Her sisters, Teresa and Isabela were also artists in the same genre.
- Violante Beatrice Siries (1709–1783) - portrait painter, teacher
- Vittoria Ligari (1713-1783) - daughter of painter Pietro Ligari.
- Anna Morandi Manzolini (1714-1774) - anatomist and anatomical wax modeler, wife of anatomist Giovanni Manzolini
- Felicità Sartori (c. 1714–1760) - nephew of engraver Antonio dall'Agata, miniaturist, pastellist.
- Giovanna Tacconi Messini (1717–1742)
- Maria Maddalena Baldacci (1718–1782)
- Angelica Le Gru Perotti (1719-1776) - daughter of the portraitist Stefano Le Gru.
- Anna Bacherini Piattoli (Bacherini) (1720–1788)
- Violante Ferroni (1720-?)
- Maria Giacomina Nazari (1724-?) - daughter of the painter Bartolomeo Nazari
- Maria Domenica Scanferla (1726-1763)
- Eleonora Monti (1727 – after 1760) - daughter of painter Francesco Mont
- Anna Caterina Gilli (before 1729 - before 1820)
- Maria Suppioti Ceroni (1730-?) - pastellist.
- Ortensia Poncarale Maggi (1732–1811) - countess, member of Academias
- Anna Galeotti (1739–1773) - engraver and painter.
- Chiara Spinelli (1744-1823) - noblewoman and pastellist.
- Vicenza Giovanna Rovisi (1750 - 1824) - daughter of painter Valentino Rovisi.
- Irene Parenti Duclos (1754–1795) - painter and poet
- Costanza Ghilini (1754–1775) - noble woman, amateur painter.
- Laura Piranesi (1754-1790) - engraver, daughter of Giovanni Battista Piranesi.
- Marianna Candidi Dionigi (1756-1826) - aristocrat, painter, writer and salonnière.
- Rosalba Bernini (1762/3–1829) - pastelist
- Anna Tonelli (c. 1763 – 1846)
- Giuseppina Quaglia Borghese (1764-1831) - pastelist
- Maria Callani (1778-1803) - daughter of artist Gaetano Callani
- Sofia Giordano (1778 – 1829)
- Anna Mignani (1786-1846)
- Ernesta Legnani Bisi (1788-1859) - painter and engraver.
- Mary Grace (died 1799/1800)
- Caterina Cherubini (d. 1811) - miniature painter, poet.
- Teresa Boccardi Nuytz (? -1837) - pastelist
- Maria Molin (?) - pastelist, daughter of senator
- Anna Borghigiani
- Margherita Terzi and her sister Maria - pupils of Rosalba Carriera

=== Netherlands ===
Category:18th-century Dutch women artists

Born in 17th century:

- Johanna Vergouwen (1630–1714) – daughter of painter-decorator Louis Vergouwen.
- Catharina Oostfries (1636–1708) – glass painter, sister of glass painter Jozef Oostfries
- Geertgen Wyntges (1636–1712) – flower painter.
- Maria Theresa van Thielen (1640–1706) – daughter of painter Jan Philip van Thielen.
- Sara Saftleven (1645–1702) – flower painter, daughter of the landscape painter Herman Saftleven
- Diana Glauber (1650 – c. 1721) – daughter of the Amsterdam chemist Johann Rudolph Glauber, and the sister of the painters Jan Gotlief and Johannes Glauber
- Joanna Koerten (1650–1715) – excelled in painting, drawing, embroidery, glass etching, and wax modeling
- Cornelia de Rijck (1653–1726) – specialized in painting birds and insects.
- Sophia Holt (1658–1734) – member of Holt-Greve artistic family
- Catarina Ykens (II) (1659–1737 or later) – daughter of the painter Johannes Ykens, geestelycke dochter (spiritual daughter), semi-nun.
- Alida Withoos (c. 1661/62 –1730) – botanical artist and painter, daughter of painter Mathias Withoos.
- Anna Ruysch (1666–1754) – flower painter, daughter of Frederik Ruysch, a botanist and anatomist.
- Aleida Greve (1670–1742) – member of Holt-Greve artistic family
- Maria de Wilde (1682–1729) – engraver and playwright, daughter of collector Jacob de Wilde.

Born in 18th century:

- Marie-Lambertine Coclers (1761 – after 1815) – Southern Netherlandish pastel artist and engraver, daughter of painter Jean-Baptiste Coclers

=== Russian Empire & Poland ===
- Alexandra Rzevskaya (1740–1769) – Russian writer and amateur artist.
- Marie-Anne Collot (1748-1821) - sculptor, daughter-in-law of Étienne Falconet. Member of Russian Academia
- Anna Rajecka (c. 1762 – 1832) – Polish portrait painter and pastellist. First Polish female to have her work represented at the Salon.

=== Spain & Portugal ===
- Luisa Roldán (1652–1706) – the earliest woman sculptor documented in Spain, daughter of sculptor Pedro Roldán, "Sculptor of the Chamber" to Carlos II.
- Andrea de Mena (1654–1734) – sculptor, daughter of sculptor Pedro de Mena.
- Claudia de Mena (1655-?) – sculptor, daughter of sculptor Pedro de Mena
- Francisca Palomino y Velasco (1655–1726)
- Bárbara María Hueva (1733–1772)
- Asunción Ferrer y Crespí (d. 1818)
- María Juana Hurtado de Mendoza (d. 1818)
- Francisca Efigenia Meléndez y Durazzo (1770–1825) - miniaturist and pastellist.
- María Luisa Carranque y Bonavía - noblewoman and pastellist.

=== Sweden & Finland ===
Category:18th-century Finnish women artists
Category:18th-century Swedish women artists

- Brita von Cöln (died 1707) – painter
- Anna Maria Ehrenstrahl (1666–1729) – painter, daughter of the painter David Klöcker Ehrenstrahl.
- Margareta Capsia (1682–1759) – the first professional native female artist in Finland, which during her lifetime was a part of Sweden.
- Anna Maria Thelott (1683–1710) – an engraver, an illustrator, a woodcut-artist, and a miniaturist painter. Daughter of engraver and watchmaker Philip Jacob Thelott the Elder.
- Helena Arnell (1697–1751) – painter

=== Switzerland ===
Category:18th-century Swiss women artists

- Anna Waser (1675-1714) - Miniaturist
- Angelica Kauffman (1751–1801) Member of the Accademia di Belle Arti di Firenze (1762), one of only two female founding members of the British Royal Academy (1768). Daughter of painter Joseph Johann Kauffmann.

=== United Kingdom / British Isles ===
Category:18th-century British women artists
Category:18th-century Irish women artists

Born in 17th century:

- Elizabeth Albin - daughter of painter Eleazar Albin
- Elizabeth Creed (1642–1728) – aristocrat, artist and philanthropist, amateur painter. Cousin of the poet John Dryden.
- Elizabeth Haselwood (c. 1644 – 1715) – the only woman silversmith recorded as having worked in Norwich.
- Sarah Hoadly (1676–1743) – wife of painter Benjamin Hoadly.
- Adriana Verelst (c. 1683 – 1769)
- Maria Verelst (1680-1744)
- Elizabeth Blackwell (1699-1758) - Scottish botanical illustrator and writer, daughter of painter Leonard Simpson.
- Dorothy Boyle, Countess of Burlington (1699-1758) - noble and court official, caricaturist and portrait painter.

Born in 18th century:

- Isabella Beetham - British silhouette artist
- Hester Bateman (1708 – 1794) - English silversmith
- Catherine Read (1723-1778) - noblewoman, Scottish painter
- Diana Beauclerk, Diana St John, Viscountess Bolingbroke (1734–1808) - noblewoman, painter
- Emma Crewe (1741 - d. in or after 1795) - noblewoman, British artist known for her designs for Josiah Wedgwood, and for her botanical art.
- Mary Moser (1744–1819). One of only two female founding members of the Royal Academy (1768). Daughter of painter George Michael Moser.
- Anne Forbes (1745–1834) - Scottish portrait painter, granddaughter of the portraitist William Aikman
- Elizabeth Upton, Baroness Templetown (1747–1823) - noblewoman, Wedgwood's designer.
- Anne Seymour Damer (1748-1828) - noble, sculptor
- Jane Parminter (1750–1811) and Mary Parminter (1767–1849) - cousins and British travellers and designers
- Frances Douglas, Lady Douglas / Frances Scott (1750-1817) - Scottish amateur artist
- Clara Pope / Clara Wheatley (1750-1838)- painter and botanical artist
- Mary Beilby (c. 1750 – 1797) – enameller and glass-painter in the Beilby glassware family.
- Ann Lee (1753 – c.1790) - British botanical illustrator
- Fanny Blood (1758-1785) - English illustrator and educator.
- Emma Jane Greenland (1760/61-1838) - painter, writer and singer.
- Maria Cosway (1760–1838) - Italian-English painter, musician, and educator
- Helena Beatson (1762–1839) - noblewoman, amateur pastellist from Scotland, niece of artist Catherine Read
- Lavinia Spencer, Countess Spencer (1762 – 1831) - noble, British illustrator.
- Elizabeth Leveson-Gower, Duchess of Sutherland (1765- 1839)
- Marie-Guillemine Benoist (1768-1826)
- Marie-Élisabeth Laville-Leroux (1770-1826) - sister of Marie-Guillemine Benoist
- Elizabeth Liddell (1770–1831) - amateur British artist specialising in pastel portrait
- Amelia Long (1772-1837) – noblewoman
- Cassandra Austen (1773 - 1845) – amateur English watercolourist and the elder sister of Jane Austen.
- Rose Emma Drummond (1790–1840) – portrait miniaturist known for her works of theatre actresses; the inspiration for Miss La Creevy in the Charles Dickens novel Nicholas Nickleby

== Books ==
- Babette Bohn, The Antique Heroines of Elisabetta Sirani, in Renaissance Studies, vol. 16, n. 1, Wiley, 2002
- Babette Bohn, Women Artists, Their Patrons, and Their Publics in Early Modern Bologna, Pennsylvania, Pennsylvania State University Press, 2021
- Dabbs, J (ed.), Life Stories of Women Artists, 1550–1800. An Anthology (Farnham 2009).
- Dabbs, Julia. “Sex, Lies, and Anecdotes: Gender Relations in the Life Stories of Italian Women Artists, 1550–1800,” Aurora, VI (2005): 35.
- Fortunati, Vera, Jordana Pomeroy, and Claudio Strinati, Italian Women Artists from Renaissance to Baroque, Milan, Skira, 2007
- Harris, Anne Sutherland and Linda Nochlin, Women Artists: 1550–1950, Los Angeles County Museum of Art, Knopf, New York, 1976
- Heller, Nancy. Women Artists: An Illustrated History. New York: Abbeville Press, 1997. ISBN 0-7892-0345-6
- Gaetano Giordani, Notizie delle donne pittrici di Bologna, Bologna, Tipografia Nobili & C., 1832
- Fidière O. Les femmes artistes à l'Académie royale de peinture et de sculpture. Paris, 1885
- Jones, Tanja L. (ed.). Women Artists in the Early Modern Courts of Europe. c. 1450 – 1700
- Lucas, Martine. Des femmes peintres: du XVe à l'aube du XIXe siècle. Paris, 2015
- Nicholson, Elizabeth S. G. "Diana Scultori." Italian Women Artists from Renaissance to Baroque: National Museum of Women in the Arts. Milano: Skira, 2007
- Rocco, Patricia. The Devout Hand: Women, Virtue, and Visual Culture in Early Modern Italy, McGill-Queen's Press – MQUP, 2017
- “Splendid Japanese Women Artists of the Edo Period”. Special Exhibition on the 120th Anniversary of Jissen Women's Educational Institute, at the Kōsetsu Memorial Museum, Tokyo, April 18 – June 21, 2015
- Weidner, M.S. Views from Jade Terrace : Chinese women artists, 1300–1912
- Yuho, Tseng. “Women Painters of the Ming Dynasty.” Artibus Asiae, vol. 53, no. 1/2, 1993, pp. 249–61.
