= Borghese (disambiguation) =

Borghese may refer to:

== Nobility ==
- House of Borghese, Italian noble house
- Borghese Petrucci, 16th century Italian politician ruled the Republic of Siena

== Other people ==
- Alessandro Borghese (born 1976), Italian celebrity chef, restaurateur, and television personality
- Borghese di Piero Borghese (1397–c.1463), Italian painter
- Brigitte Borghese (1951–2012), Morocco-born French actress
- Claudio Borghese (?–1590), Roman Catholic bishop
- Domenico Viglione Borghese (1877–1957), Italian operatic baritone and actor
- Elisabeth Mann Borgese (1918–2002), expert on maritime law and policy and the protection of the environment
- Euphrasie Borghèse (1818–?), French operatic soprano
- Giovanni Ventura Borghese (died 1708) was an Italian painter
- Giuseppina Quaglia Borghese (1764–1831), Italian painter and pastellist
- Ippolito Borghese (late 16th century–1627), Italian painter
- Juliette Borghèse (1834–?), French operatic mezzo-soprano
- Lorenzo Borghese (born 1972), Italian-American television personality and businessman
- Mario Borghese, Italian politician
- Martino Borghese (born 1987), Swiss footballer
- Pietro Borghese (1398–1484), Italian painter
- Salvatore Borghese (born 1937), a.k.a. Sal Borgese, Italian actor

== Others ==
- Il Borghese, Italian magazine

== See also ==
- Borgese
