= Sarah Williams =

Sarah or Sara Williams may refer to:

== People ==
- Sarah Williams (historian) (1828–1861), English historian
- Sarah Williams (poet) (1837–1868), English poet and novelist
- Sarah Williams (screenwriter) (fl. 1991–present), English screenwriter
- Sarah Anne Williams (fl. 2009–present), American voice actress
- Sarah Furman Warner Williams (1764–1848), American embroider and quiltmaker
- Sarah-Rose Williams, member of the New York City Ballet
- Sarah Wescot-Williams (born 1956), Sint Maarten politician
- Sarah Williams (badminton) (born 1961), Welsh badminton player
- Sarah Williams Goldhagen (born 1959), née Williams, American author and architecture critic
- Sara Lockwood Williams (1889–1961), American journalist and clubwoman

== Characters ==
- Sarah Williams (Labyrinth), the main character of the 1986 film Labyrinth, played by Jennifer Connelly
- Sarah Williams, a character of the 2000 film Waking the Dead, also played by Jennifer Connelly

== See also ==
- Sarah Brydges Willyams (bef. 1783–1863), English supporter and confidante of Benjamin Disraeli
