= Nazario Nazari =

Italian painter

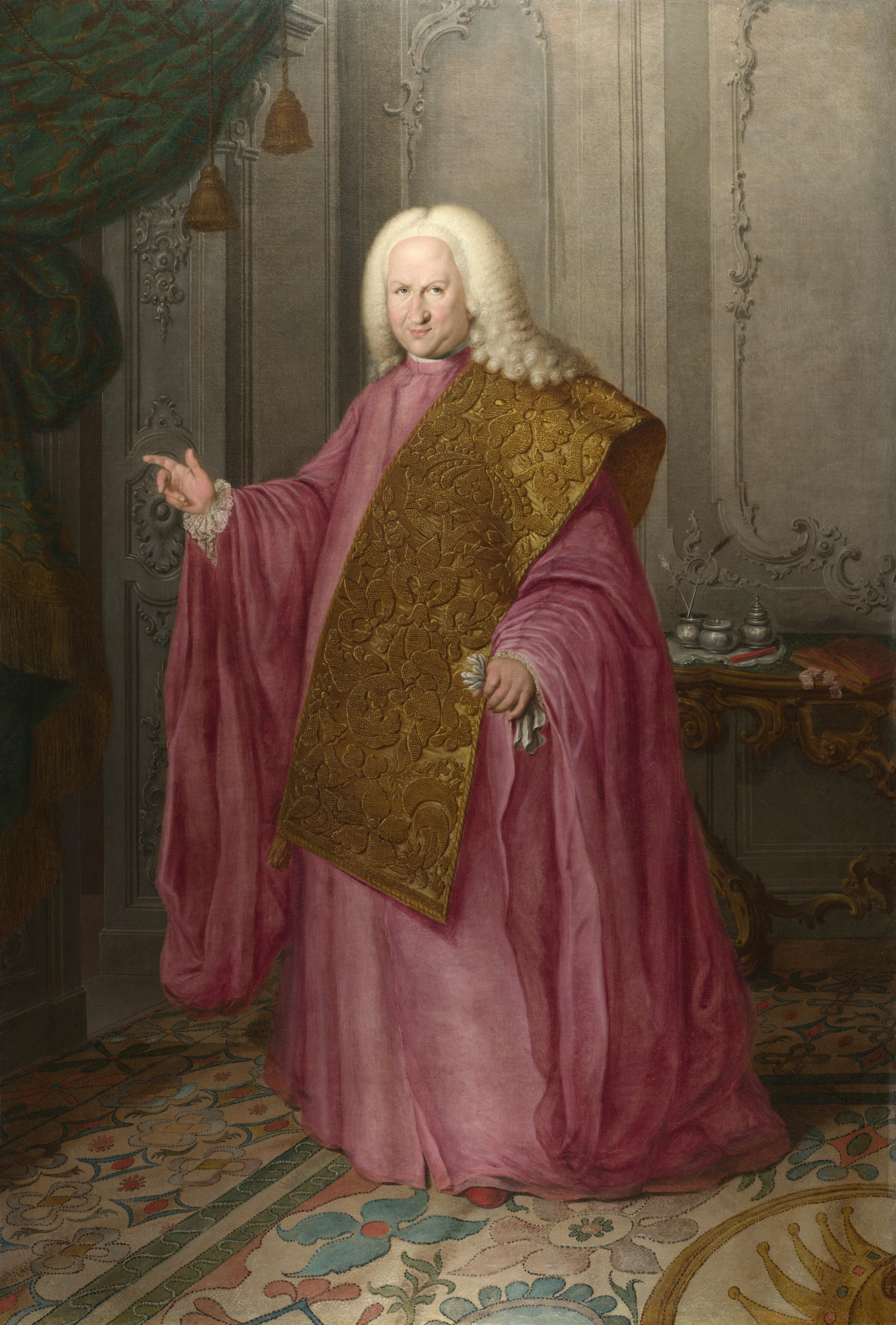
- Portrait of Andrea Tron, c. 1750, National Gallery, London
- Born: 1724; Clusone, Bergamo, Republic of Venice
- Died: After 1793
- Education: Bartolomeo Nazari
- Known for: Painting
- Movement: Baroque, Rococo

Nazario Nazari (1724 – after 1793) was an Italian painter, active in a late-Baroque or Rococo style, in and around Venice. Nazario was well known as a portraitist of aristocratic officials of the Republic of Venice.

== Early life ==
He was born in Clusone, the son and pupil of the painter Bartolomeo Nazari; his sister Maria was also active as a painter. He was active in Bergamo from 1750–1755. He was then sent to Venice, because his father wished to separate him from bad company. Among his portraits, were those of Elena Bresciani, Antonio Roncalli, Countess Maria Olimpia Coleoni, and in 1755 Sir Bartolomeo Vitalba. In 1755, traveled to Genoa with his father.

== Bibliography ==
- Tassi, Francesco Maria (1793). Vite de' pittori, scultori ed architetti bergamaschi. Vol. 2. Bergamo: Locatelli. p. 95.
