= Elisha Perkins =

American physician (1741–1799)

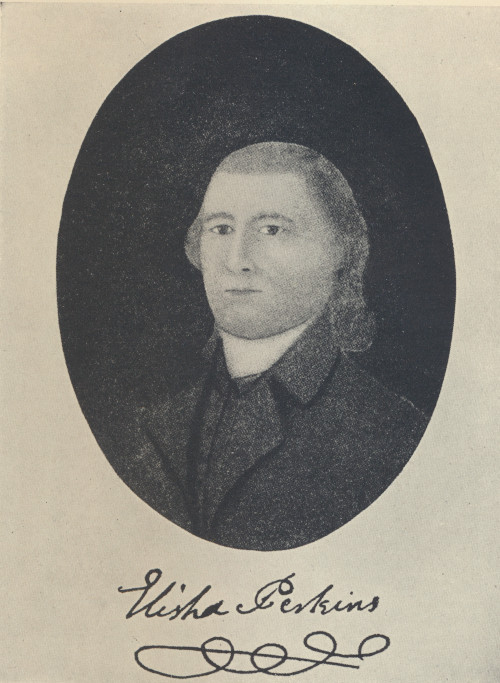
- Born: January 16, 1741; Norwich, Connecticut Colony, British America
- Died: September 6, 1799 (aged 58); New York City, U.S.
- Occupation: Physician
- Known for: Perkins Patent Tractors
- Children: 2, (including Sarah)
- Military career
- Branch: Continental Army
- Rank: Surgeon
- Conflicts: American Revolutionary War; Siege of Boston; Battle of Bunker Hill

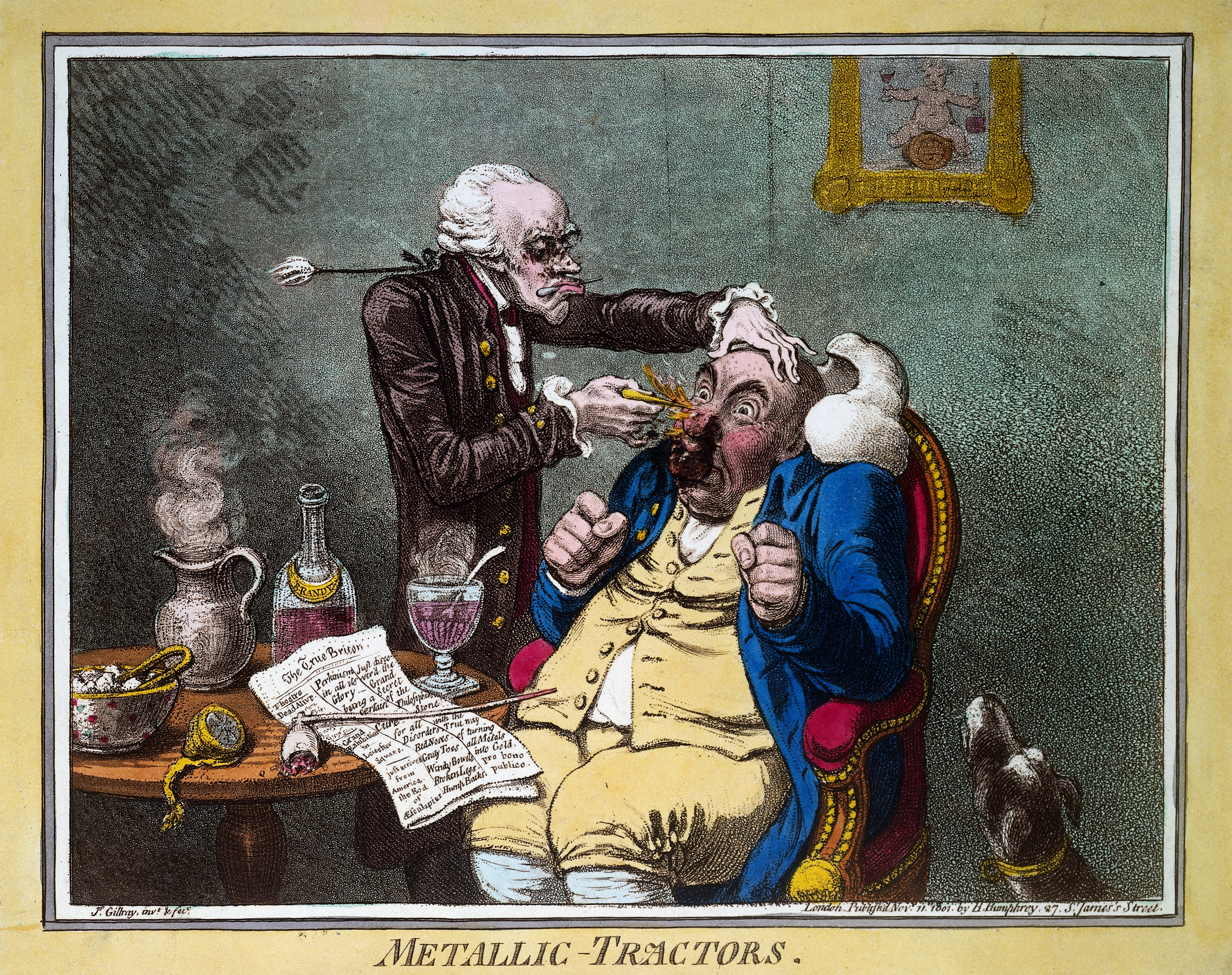
Metallic Tractors. Caricature of a quack treating a patient with Perkins Patent Tractors by James Gillray, 1801

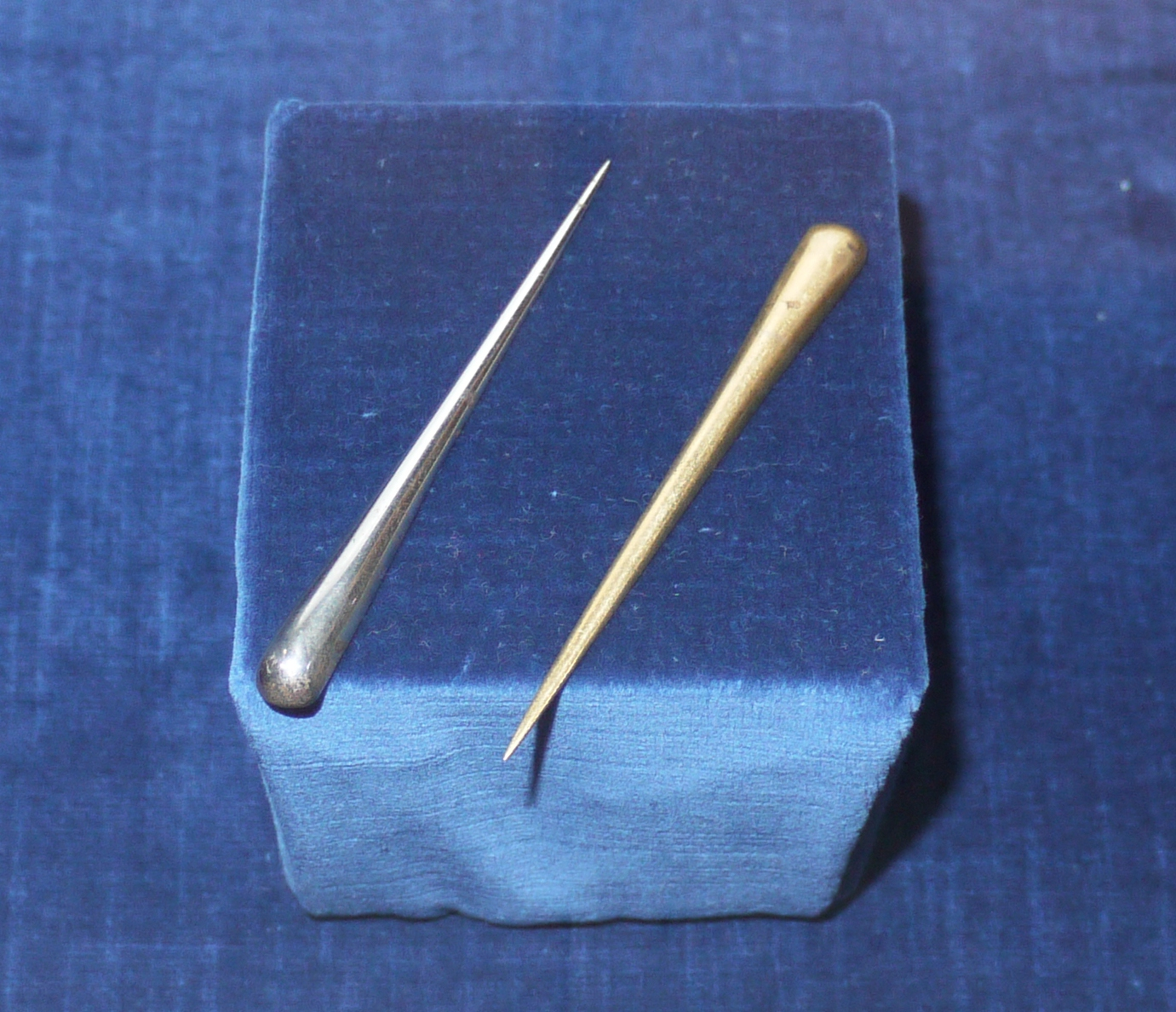
Modern facsimiles of Perkins tractors

Elisha Perkins (January 16, 1741 – September 6, 1799) was an American physician who created a fraudulent medical device, the Perkins Patent Tractors. Although they were made of steel and brass, Perkins claimed that they were made of unusual metal alloys. Perkins claimed his rods cured inflammation, rheumatism and pain in the head and the face; he applied the points on the aching body part and passed them over the part for about 20 minutes. The device was later the subject of the first placebo research.

== Early life and military service ==
Elisha Perkins was born in 1741 in Norwich, Connecticut. He was educated by his father, Joseph Perkins, in Plainfield, Connecticut, where he later practiced medicine with success. When the American Revolutionary War broke out, Perkins served as a surgeon for the Continental Army during the Battle of Bunker Hill in the Siege of Boston.

== Career ==
During the late 18th century, the progression of medicine due to the Enlightenment increased the consumer demand for new therapies, such as therapeutic devices and inventions. Consequently, around 1795–96, Perkins invented his "Tractors", for which he took out a 14-year patent on February 19, 1796. The tractors consisted of two 3-inch metal rods with a pointed end; the term is from the old meaning of tractor, "that which pulls", as in the term 'tractor beams'. Although they were made of steel and brass, Perkins claimed that they were made of unusual metal alloys. Perkins claimed his rods cured inflammation, rheumatism and pain in the head and the face. He applied the points on the aching body part and passed them over the part for about 20 minutes. Perkins claimed they could "draw off the noxious electrical fluid that lay at the root of suffering".

The Connecticut Medical Society condemned the tractors as "delusive quackery", and expelled Perkins from membership on the grounds that he was "a patentee and user of nostrums". Perkins nevertheless managed to convince three US medical faculties that his method worked. In Copenhagen, Denmark, twelve surgeons at the royal Frederiks Hospital also began to support the method. Even George Washington bought a set. Other physicians' criticisms were met with charges of elitism and professional arrogance. Perkins boasted of 5,000 cured cases. The cures were certified to by eight professors, forty physicians, and thirty clergymen. Of the purchase made by Washington, Perkins' son, Benjamin Perkins, said that the "President of the United States, convinced of the importance of the discovery from experiments in his own family, availed himself of its advantages by purchasing a set of the Tractors for their use."

Benjamin Perkins was a bookseller and introduced the tractors to London. There a Perkinsian Institution for the benefit of the poor was founded under the presidency of Lord Rivers. In 1798, Benjamin published The Influence of Metallic Tractors on the Human Body. In October 1799, an advertisement in The Times said that "The tractors, with every necessary direction for using them in Families, may be had for 5 guineas the set, of Mr. Perkins, of Leicester Square; or of Mr. Frederic Smith, Chemist & Druggist, in the Haymarket".

Aylmer Bourke Lambert, a British botanist, is on record as having written in January 1800 to Richard Pulteney of Blandford (now Blandford Forum), in the English county of Dorset, as follows:

"I breakfasted with Sir Joseph [Banks] on Monday morning who is recovered from the Gout and in high Spirits. We had a good deal of laughing about the Tractors. Perkins has published several Cases communicated by my Father, and presented me with a copy of his Book."

== Death and legacy ==
Shortly before his death Elisha Perkins also invented purported antiseptic medicine and used it for dysentery and sore throat. Perkins also claimed to have discovered a cure for yellow fever. This consisted of vinegar with muriate of soda which he tested in New York City during an outbreak in 1799. The cure had no effect and Perkins contracted the fever and died.

After Perkins' death, British physicians began to have doubts about his tractors. In 1799, Dr. John Haygarth conducted a test in which he treated five rheumatic patients with wooden tractors that were made to resemble the metallic ones. Four of them reported that the pain was relieved. The next day the patients were treated with metallic tractors with the same results. Dr. Haygarth reported on his findings in a publication entitled On the Imagination as a Cause & as a Cure of Disorders of the Body. Attempts to use the tractors to cure animals proved futile.

By this time, Perkins had numerous influential supporters and the sale of the tractors continued. In 1803, Thomas Green Fessenden published his poem "Terrible Tractoration" in favor of Perkins and as a satire on other physicians. Perkins' son died in 1810. After that the popularity of the tractors began to wane.

In 1932, Morris Fishbein commented that "[u]nfortunately no one has yet been able to determine whether Elisha Perkins was merely a somewhat deluded physician or actually a great impostor."

Perkins was the father of Sarah Bushnell Perkins, who is remembered for her pastels.
