= Borgese =

Borgese is an Italian surname. Notable people with the surname include:

- Alessandro Borgese (born 1985), Italian footballer
- Elisabeth Mann Borgese, CM (1918–2002), German-born Canadian writer and environmentalist
- Ève Goldfarb-Borgese (born 1951), professionally known as Yeva, Israeli-French sculptor
- Giuseppe Antonio Borgese (1882–1952), Italian writer, journalist and literary critic
- Sal Borgese (born 1937), Italian actor

== See also ==
- Borghese (disambiguation)
