= Gaetano Callani =

Italian painter

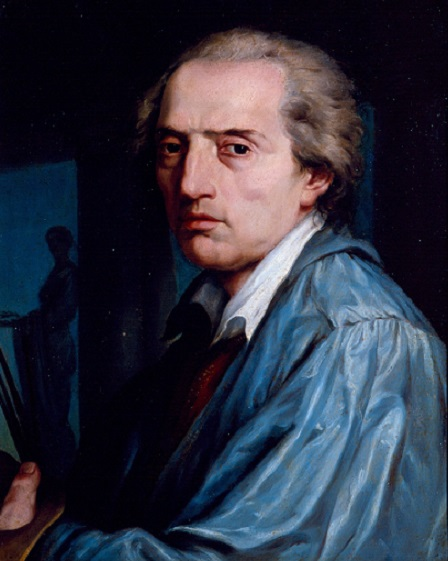
- Gaetano Calliani, pastel portrait by his daughter, Maria Callani
- Born: 16 January 1736; Parma, Duchy of Parma and Piacenza
- Died: 6 November 1809 (aged 73); Parma, Duchy of Parma and Piacenza
- Education: Giambettino Cignaroli
- Known for: Painting
- Movement: Neoclassicism

Gaetano Callani (16 January 1736 – 6 November 1809) was an Italian Neoclassical painter and sculptor, active mainly in his native Parma.

== Biography ==
Born at Parma on 16 January 1736, Callani was a pupil of the Rococo painter Giambettino Cignaroli. He soon abandoned his master's late Baroque style and moved towards a more restrained, classicizing painting.

In 1774, he was commissioned to work on the decoration of the Room of the Caryatids, a grand hall designed by Giuseppe Piermarini for the Royal Palace of Milan. The following year, he was appointed professor of sculpture at the recently established Brera Academy, but he resigned after a few months. Back in Parma, he competed the statues of Isaiah and St. John the Evangelist for the church of the Annunziata and the Beatitudes for the church of Sant'Antonio Abate.

In 1777, he married Angela Gerli. Both their children, Francesco (1779-1844) and Maria, became painters. Callani died in Parma on 6 November 1809 and was buried Chapel of the Santissimo Sacramento in the Cathedral of Parma.
