= Teresa Boccardi Nuytz =

Italian artist (died 1837)

Clara Teresa Boccardi Nuytz (died 1837) was an Italian pastellist.

Nuytz was active in Turin at the same time as Sofia Giordano and Giuseppina Quaglia Borghese, and was the daughter of the secretary of the Accademia reale delle scienze di Torino. She studied with Laurent Pécheux, and in 1790 was recorded as a consorella of the Compagnia di San Luca; when Borghese applied for admission in 1795, Nuytz declared her support. She was married to Giuseppe Antonio Nuytz. Only a handful of pastels are known; they were exhibited in Turin in 1820, but their dates of creation are not recorded. One of these, a portrait of Pope Pius VII, is classed as a state asset of Italy.
