= Vincenza Giovanna Rovisi =

Italian artist (1750–1824)

Vincenza Giovanna Rovisi (Venice, 1750 - Cavalese (Trento), 1824) was an Italian painter in a late Baroque and Neoclassical styles.

She had trained with her father, Valentino Rovisi, a follower of Giambattista Tiepolo. She married the painter of the Val di Fiemme, A. L. Bonora (Domenico Bonora?). She worked alongside her father in his late age, including on the Via Crucis of the parish church of Torcegno (1775) and the frescoes in the parish churches of Roncegno and Cavedine (1779-1782). Circa 1779, she alone completed the frescoes in the apse at Roncegno (St Paul on the Road to Damascus and Episodes in the Life of St Peter).
