= Anne d'Yves =

Anne Therese Philippine, comtesse d'Yves (22 July 1738, Brussels - 1814) was a politically active noblewoman, pamphlet writer and a participant in the Brabant Revolution of 1789.

== Life ==
Anne Therese Philippine d'Yves was an unmarried countess with a wide network of contacts in society: she hosted a political salon in Brussels. Her political activism was well known; the mayor of Brussels, who was her frequent guest, was arrested and she was warned that she should stop her political involvement as her views were talked about all over the town.

She played an active part in the revolution by establishing contacts between the various factions of the anti-Austrian opposition, kept in contact with both the traditionalist opposition as well as the democrats, arranged meetings between them, was instrumental in the efforts to unite the nobility, the guilds and the democratic revolutionaries against the Austrians and was the only one to have made a true effort in the unification of the opposition.

Her political activity made her praised as a revolutionary heroine, but her example was not unique: the Duchess d'Arenberg and the Duchess d'Ursel also participated in the revolution by providing the revolutionaries with armies, and the latter even met and welcomed Henri Van der Noot and Jeanne de Bellem upon their triumphant arrival into Brussels in 1789.

== See also ==
- Jeanne de Bellem

== Sources ==
- Janet Polansky: Women in Revolutionary Belgium: from Stone Throwers to Hearth Tenders, 87-104
- Harriet Branson Applewhite & Darline G. Levy (1993) Women and Politics in the Age of the Democratic Revolution. University of Michigan Press. Sid. 152–160. ISBN 9782873864347
- Linda L. Clark: Women and Achievement in Nineteenth-Century Europe, Cambridge University press, 2008, p.30.
