= Jeanne de Bellem =

Revolutionist, writer

Marie-Thérèse Pinaut
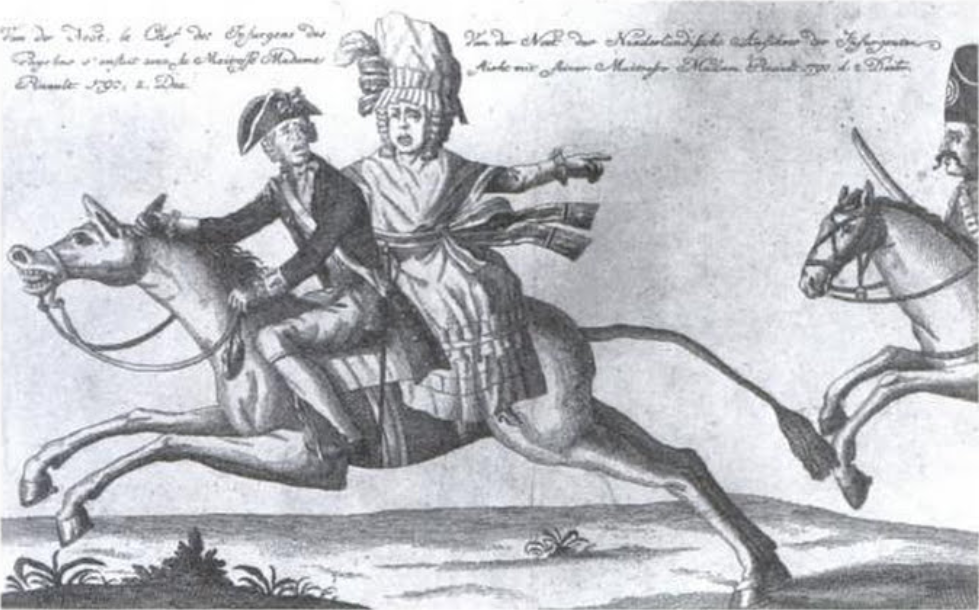
- Jean de Bellem fleeing with Henri Van der Noot after the collapse of the United Belgian States
- Born: 1 March 1734; Namur, Austrian Netherlands
- Died: 12 October 1805 (aged 71); Amsterdam, Batavian Republic
- Other name: Jeanne de Bellem
- Occupations: Writer; revolutionary
- Political party: Statist
- Partner(s): Various, including Henri Van der Noot
- Children: Marianne de Bellem

Jeanne de Bellem or Jeanne Pinaut (1 March 1734 – 12 October 1805), was a politically active pamphlet writer and a participator of the Brabant Revolution of 1789. She had a long-term relationship with the revolutionary leader Henri Van der Noot and exerted a great deal of political influence upon the rule within the United States of Belgium 1789–1790.

== Biography ==
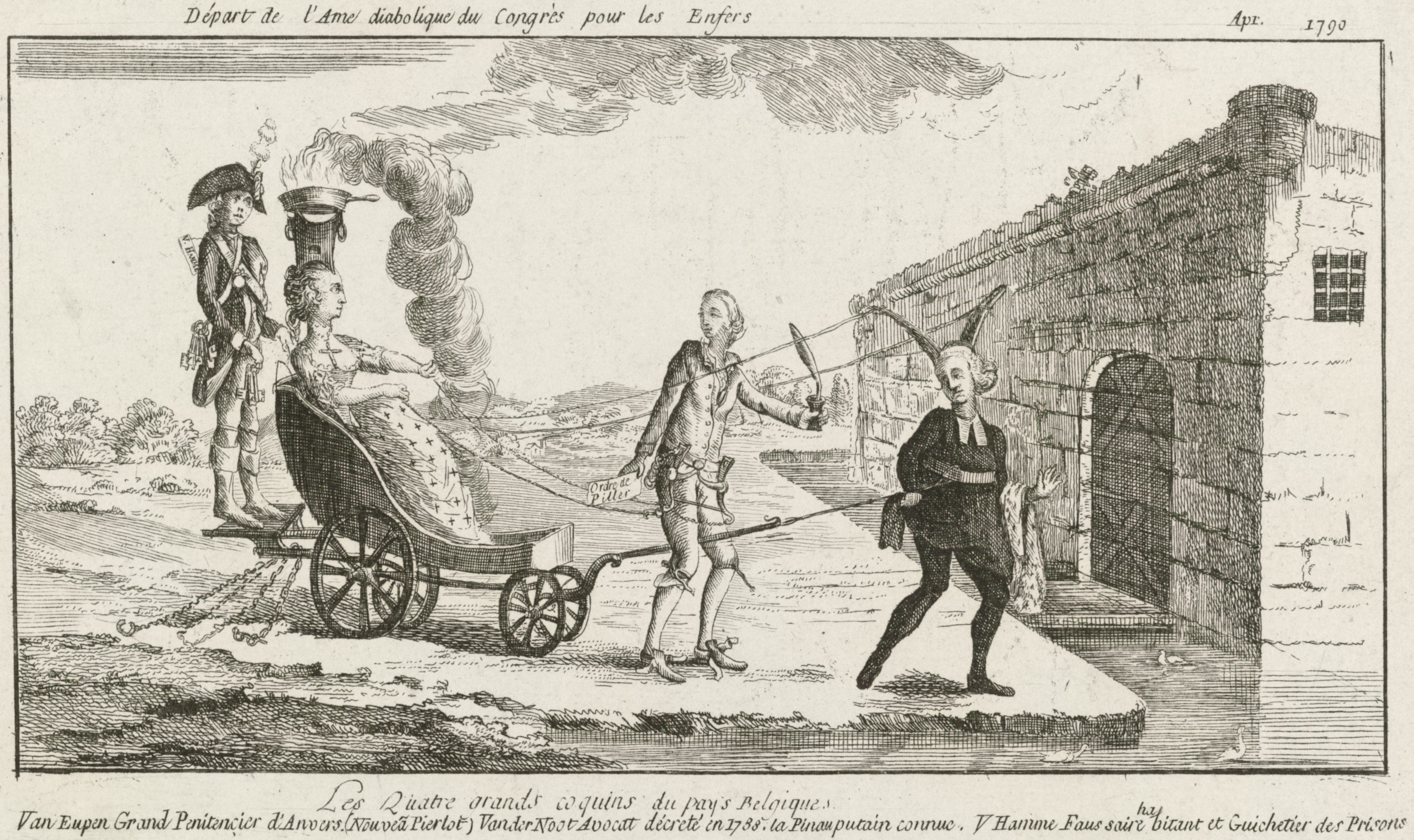
Cartoon of Hendrik van der Noot and Petrus van Eupen, 1790, anonymous, 1787–1790

Jeanne de Bellem was born in poverty but was given a good education. She arrived in Brussels in 1750, where she worked as a domestic and a prostitute and became known for being the mistress of many notables, such as the general governor Ollivier and vicomte de Quenonville, and had a daughter Marianne de Bellem, by an unknown father. In parallel, she had a serious and lifelong relationship with Henri Van der Noot.

From 1787, Bellem was a well-known writer of political pamphlets, which encouraged the Belgians to follow the example of America and rise in rebellion toward Austria; she wrote the famous revolutionary poem: "Peuple Belgique/cour tyrannique/faisons commet l'Amerique". She was also politically active as the intermediary of Van der Noot, who spoke to the Belgian estates and maintained contact with them with her as messenger, as they did not dare to speak to Van der Noot directly. In 1788, during Noot's absence in London, she was arrested for her political activity and put on trial. The trial aroused great attention, but ended with her release after her public apology. She was arrested again in 1789 but was released shortly before the revolution, and gained troops for the rebellion. The 18 December 1789, Jeanne de Bellem participated in the entrance of Henri Van der Noot in Brussels in the carriage by his side and attended the theatre by his side.

The involvement of Jeanne de Bellem in the state affairs of the republic was controversial and she was the target of a lot of abusive caricatures by the opposition who used her as a way of criticizing Van der Noot and the government. She was called Noots official mistress, was said to encourage her lovers to attack the democrats in a contra-revolutionary coup, and when Van der Noot took the title of Duke, she was said to long for the title of Duchess. In parallel to the slander, however, she also received a great deal of praise and admiration. It was said that Jeanne de Bellem, Henri Van der Noot and their (male) colleague Eupen lived in a menage-a-trois. Bellem was also in charge of the pamphlets issued by the state.

Upon the return of the Austrians and the death of the republic in 1790, Jeanne de Bellem was separated from Van der Noot and fled with her daughter Marianne to Breda in the Netherlands.

== See also ==
- Anne Therese Philippine d'Yves

== Sources ==
- Dictionnaire des femmes belges. Éditions Racine 2006. ISBN 2-87386-434-6
- Biographie Nationale Tome 17
