= Giuseppe Monticone =

Italian painter

Giuseppe Monticone (4 February 1769 – 26 January 1837) was an Italian painter, active mostly in Turin painting portraits.

== Biography ==
He was born in Turin, where he trained under Laurent Pecheux and gained a royal stipend. He was recruited in 1806 to teach design at the public Lyceum of Turin. In 1814, he was named professor of Design in the Royal College of Turin. In 1821, with the death of the aged Pecheux, Monticone was named honorary painter to the monarch. With the restoration of the Academy of Fine Arts, he was elected secretary. Among his pupils at the Academy were Ferdinando Cavalleri of Savigliano, Michele Cusa of Varallo, and Luigi Barne (1798-1837) of Turin. Monticone, along with Marchese Roberto d'Azeglio, played a role in reorganizing the painting collection of the Royal Palace.
