= Laurent Pécheux =

Italian painter

Laurent Pécheux (17 July 1729 – 1821) was a French-born painter, active in Rome and Northern Italy in a Neoclassical-style.

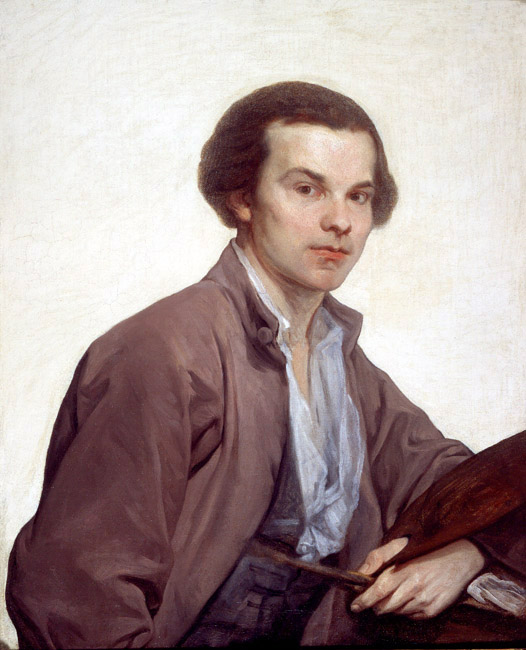
Portrait of Pécheux by JB Greuze or Domenico Corvi

== Biography ==
Born in Lyon, France, Pécheux initially studied at the Jesuit College, but was sent to Paris where he frequented the studio of Charles-Joseph Natoire, Jean-Baptiste Pillement, and Jean-Antoine Morand. In 1751, the artists Gabriel-François Doyen and Augustin Pajou, winners of the Prix de Rome in 1748, convinced him to go to Rome. He obtained money from his father and arrived in 1753.

There, at the invitation of Nicolas Guibal, he frequented the studio of Anton Raphael Mengs. He also befriended Pompeo Batoni. He lived circa 1757 in the neighborhood of Trinità dei Monti, and there set up a teaching studio.

He was recruited in 1765 to paint a portrait of Princess Maria Luisa of Bourbon-Parma for the family of her fiancé, the Prince of Asturias, who would later become Charles IV of Spain. In 1777, Pécheux taught painting at the Accademia Albertina of Turin. He died in Turin. The pastellist Teresa Boccardi Nuytz was a pupil. He was also a tutor in Turin of the painter Giuseppe Monticone.
