= Sarah Bushnell Perkins =

American artist (1771–1831)

Sarah Bushnell Perkins, later Grosvenor (1771–1831) was an amateur American pastellist.

Born in Plainfield, Connecticut, Perkins was the daughter of Dr. Elisha Perkins, one of the proprietors of the Plainfield Academy, which she may have attended.

The pastels which are known to be hers date from the 1790s and mainly depict members of her family. Her paintings are now held by numerous organizations, including the historical societies of Connecticut and Rhode Island and Historic Deerfield. Stylistically they are primitive, using a small amount of color only for depicting flesh tones. Perkins married General Lemuel Grosvenor in 1801, and appears to have given up art at this time; some have attempted to identify her with the Beardsley Limner, active between 1785 and 1805, but on stylistic grounds this appears unlikely. Others have noted her mother's death in 1795 and her father's in 1799, indicating that she may have given up her work to look after her siblings.

She is buried in the Pomfret Street Cemetery in Pomfret, Connecticut.
