= Marianne de Bellem =

Belgian artist (1767–1798)

Marianne de Bellem (6 October 1767 - 17 December 1798) was a revolutionary and pastellist from the Austrian Netherlands.

== Biography ==
De Bellem was likely born in Brussels, the daughter of the revolutionary Jeanne de Bellem and an unknown father; Guillaume-François Bertout de Carillo, vicomte d’Ottignies, dit de Quenonville has been proposed as a candidate.

What little is known about her comes largely from a play by De Beaunoir, Histoire secrète et anecdotique de l'Insurrection belgique, ou Vander-Noot, dating to 1790. This claims that she was the mistress of Pierre van Eupen, and that by 1787 she and her mother had been encouraged by the latter's lover, Hendrik Van der Noot, to distribute revolutionary pamphlets in the streets of Brussels calling for an insurrection against the Austrians. Eventually they were required to flee the city; this is the last recorded sighting of Marianne.

Her artistic activities are attested to in a number of letters between her mother and Van der Noot in which Jeanne thanks him for providing pastels for her daughter. A June 28, 1791 letter from Rotterdam, to which city the women had fled, was published in the Nouvelles extraordinaires de divers endroits on July 5 and states that Marianne has taken up painting pastels and miniatures as a way of providing an income. Her whereabouts after this are unknown.

No works are traced, but the stage directions for Act IV of De Beaunoir's play direct that the walls should be decorated with "postures choisies de l’Aretin, dessinés au pastel par Mariane".
