= Ortensia Poncarale Maggi =

Italian artist (1732–1811)

Ortensia Poncarale Maggi (1732–1811) was an Italian painter. Her maiden name is sometimes given as Poncarli or Poncarali.

Maggi was born in Brescia, the daughter of Ercole Poncarli (or Poncarale) and Chiara Rodengo. In 1762, she married Count Annibale Camillo Maggi-Via. She lived in Parma for many years. Maggi studied painting with Francesco Monti, and worked in oil and pastels. In 1760, she was admitted to the Accademia di belle arti di Parma of Parma, and in 1761, she became a member of the Accademia di Belle Arti di Bologna. The reception piece, which she produced for the former, a pastel of a farm girl with a basket of fruit, is kept in the Galleria nazionale di Parma, and is today her only surviving work.
