= Pietro Borghese =

Italian painter

- Born: 1398; Borgo San Sepolcro; Tuscany; Italy
- Died: 1484 (aged 85–86)
- Other names: Pietro della Francesca
- Occupation: Painter

Pietro Borghese (also called Pietro della Francesca; 1398–1484) was an Italian painter of the early Renaissance period. He is described as being born in Borgo San Sepolcro, painting battle-scenes, and influencing Melozzo da Forlì. This may in fact be a painter confused with Piero della Francesca.
