= Asunción Ferrer y Crespí =

Spanish artist (died 1818)

Doña María de la Asunción Ferrer y Crespí de Valdaura (died 1818) was a Spanish painter.

Ferrer y Crespí was named an Académica de mérito at the Academia de San Carlos in Valencia on 26 October 1795, presenting as her reception piece a head after Guido Reni, in a gold frame and glazed. In 1897 her work could still be found in a variety of Valencian private collections, and she was especially known for her pastel pieces.
