= Sant'Antonio Abate, Parma =

Church building in Parma, Italy

Coordinates: 44°48′1.98″N 10°20′1.39″E

Church of St Anthony Abbot; Chiesa di Sant'Antonio Abate (Italian)
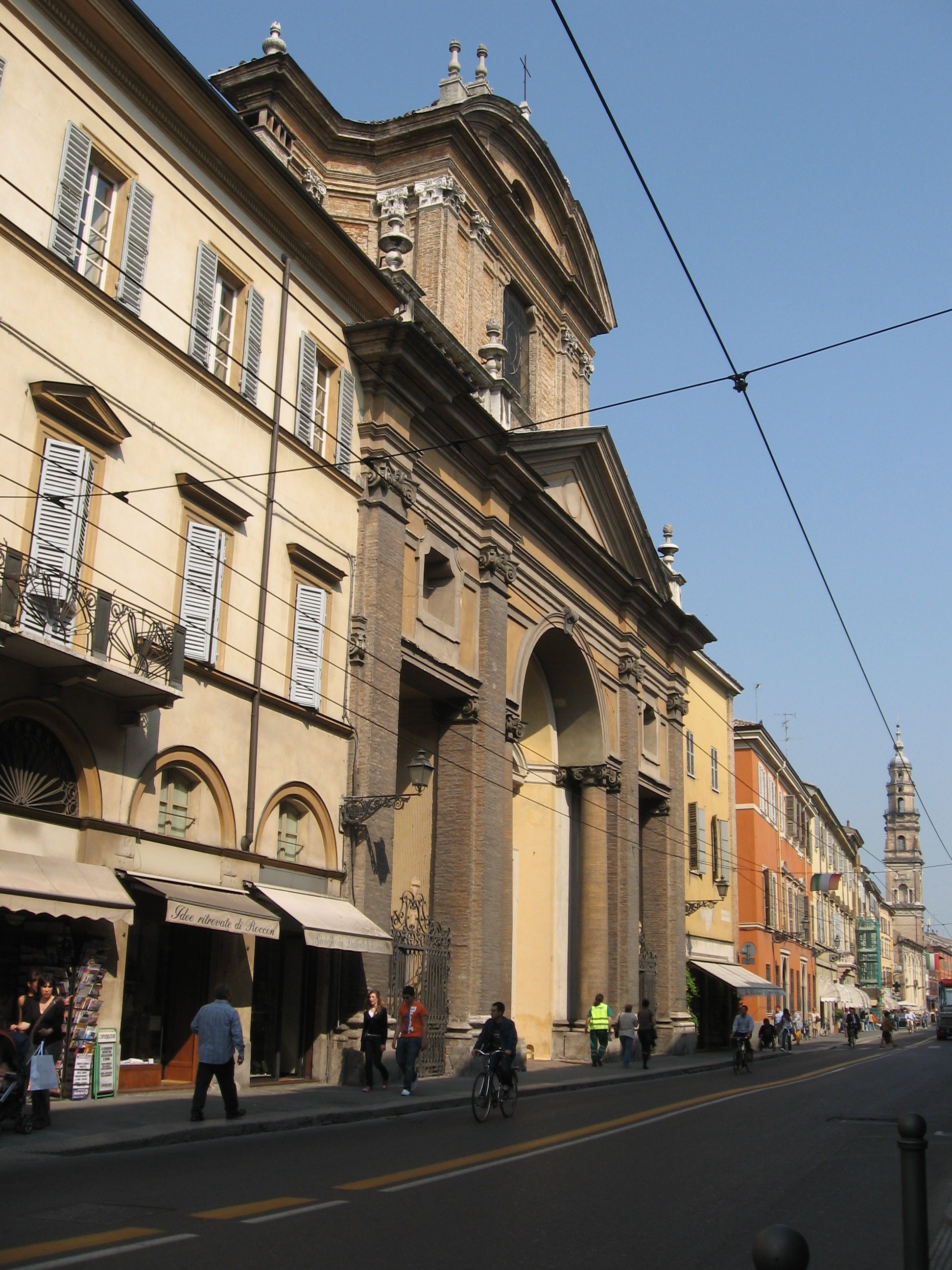
- Sant'Antonio Abate

Religion
- Affiliation: Catholic

Location
- Location: Parma, Italy
- Interactive map of: Church of St Anthony Abbot; Chiesa di Sant'Antonio Abate (Italian)

Architecture
- Architect: Ferdinando Galli-Bibiena
- Style: Baroque
- Groundbreaking: 1766

The church of Sant'Antonio Abate is located in Parma, Italy.

== History ==
Initial construction of a church at the site began in 1386 and ended in 1404, under the commission of Canons Regular of St. Anthony of Vienna. Under the commission of Cardinal Antonio Francesco Sanvitale and a donation by Pope Clement XIII, in the 1700s the church was rebuilt to designs of the architect and decorator Ferdinando Galli-Bibiena. The church was reconsecrated in 1766.
