= Maria Callani =

Italian artist (1778–1803)

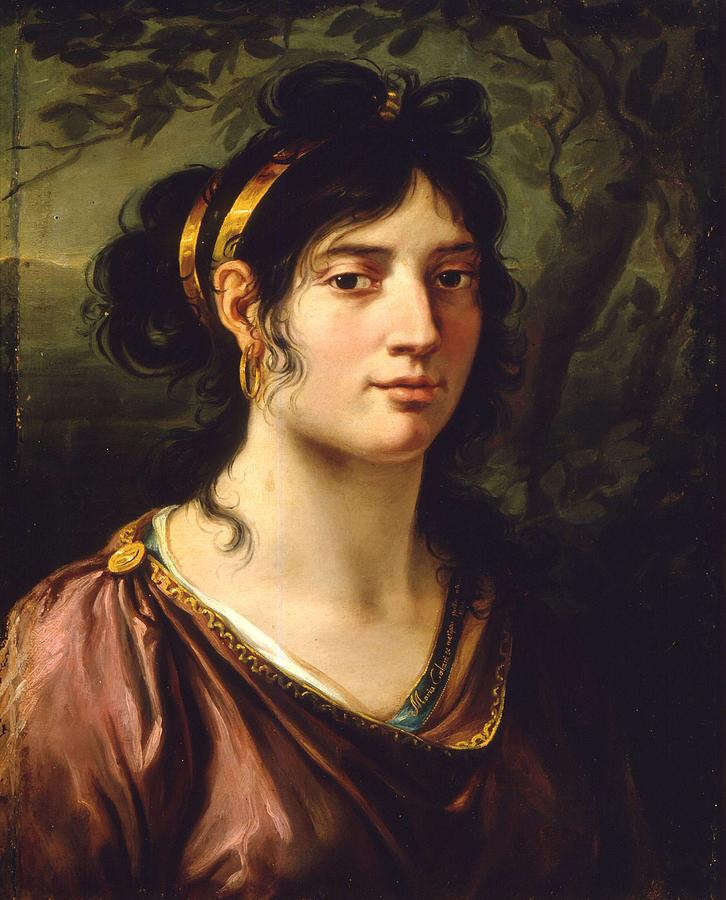
- Self-portrait, (1802) oil on panel, from the Galleria nazionale di Parma
- Born: 15 August 1779; Milan, Italy
- Died: 9 February 1803 (aged 24); Parma, Italy
- Occupation: painter

Maria Callani (15 August 1778 – 9 February 1803) was an Italian portrait painter, active in the 18th century in Milan and Parma, Italy.

== Biography ==
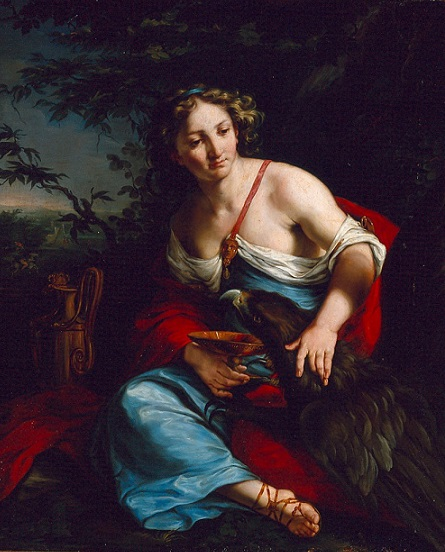
Maria Callani, Hebe and the eagle, (1803), oil on canvas

Maria Callani was born 15 August 1778 in Milan, Italy, her father was artist Gaetano Callani and her mother was Angela Gerli, the sister of the architect it:Agostino Gerli. Her younger brother Francesco Callani (1779–1844) was also a portrait painter.

Her portraits included notable figures like the Countess Chiara Mazzucchini Guidoboni of Viadana, Alessandro Sanvitale, it:Stefano Sanvitale, and Fra Antonio Negroni,.

Callani died at the age of 24 of tuberculosis on 9 February 1803 in Parma. Her works can be found in various public museum collections including Galleria nazionale di Parma, Museo Glauco Lombardi, it:Pinacoteca Stuard, among others.
