= Bartolomeo Nazari =

Italian portraitist (1693–1758)

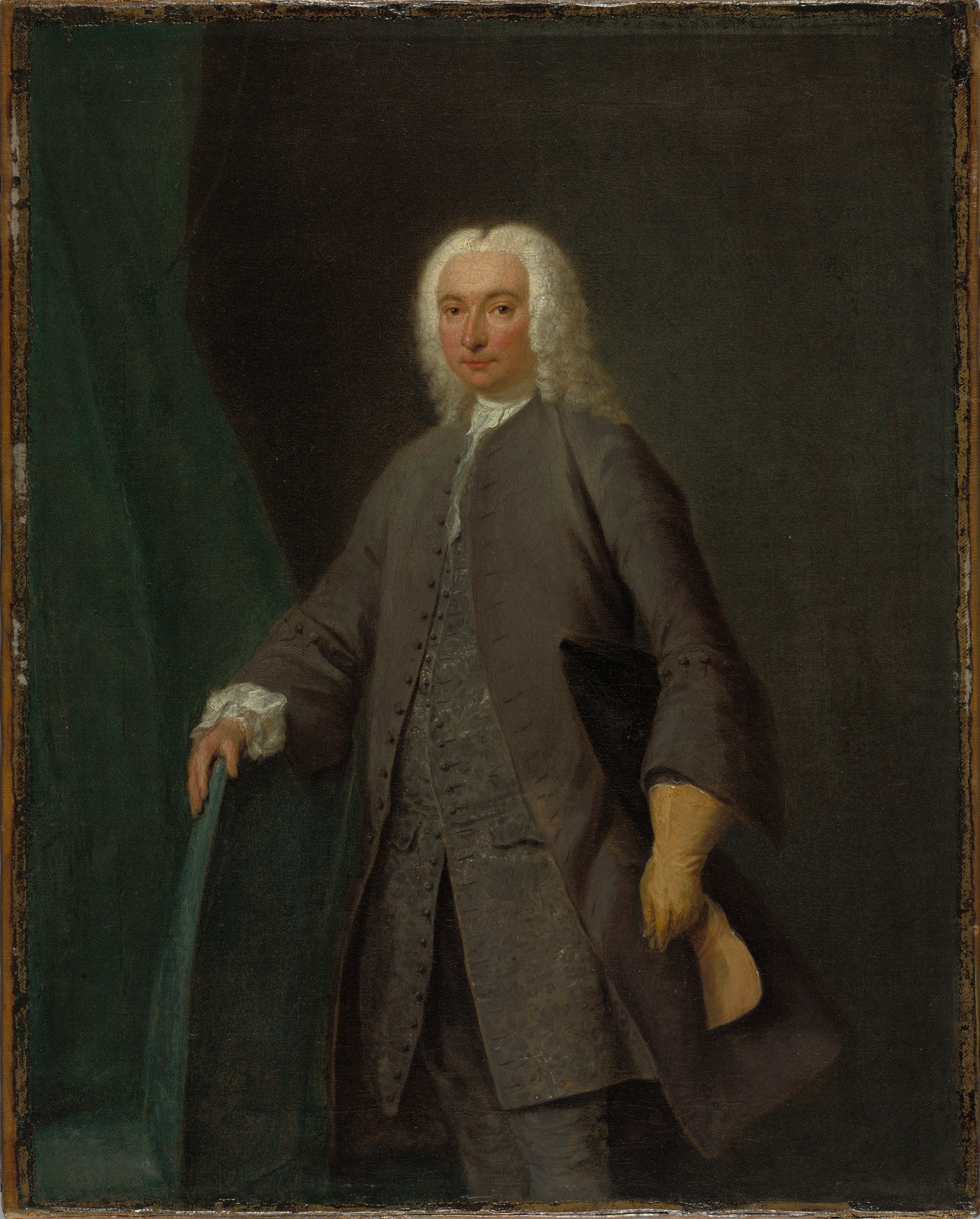
- Portrait of a Man, Fogg Museum, Cambridge, Massachusetts
- Born: 31 May 1693; Clusone, Bergamo, Republic of Venice
- Died: 24 August 1758 (aged 65); Milan, Duchy of Milan
- Education: Angelo Trevisani
- Known for: Painting
- Movement: Baroque, Rococo

Bartolomeo Nazari (31 May 1693 – 24 August 1758) was an Italian painter of the late-Baroque, mainly active in Venice as a portraitist.

== Biography ==
Bartolomeo Nazari was born in Clusone, near Bergamo, to a lower-middle class family. By 1716, he had become an apprentice under Angelo Trevisani. In 1723 he visited the Roman studio of Angelo's brother, Francesco Trevisani. He also studied with Benedetto Luti. Nazari may have known Fra Galgario, the renowned portraitist from Bergamo, and is described by some as his pupil. He returned to Venice in 1724, and was registered with the Fraglia dei Pittori, the Venetian painters' guild, by 1726.

In 1744, he travelled to Frankfurt to paint the emperor Charles VII and his family and other members of the court. In 1756, he was inducted into the newly founded Accademia di Belle Arti of Venice. His son Nazario Nazari was also a painter, as was his daughter Maria. Among his patrons were Consul Joseph Smith and the former general Johann Matthias von der Schulenburg (who owned over eight of his portrait paintings). He painted the portraits of a number of operatic singers including Farinelli. He died in Milan, returning from Genoa, where he had painted the Doge Giovanni Giacomo Grimaldi.

== Works ==
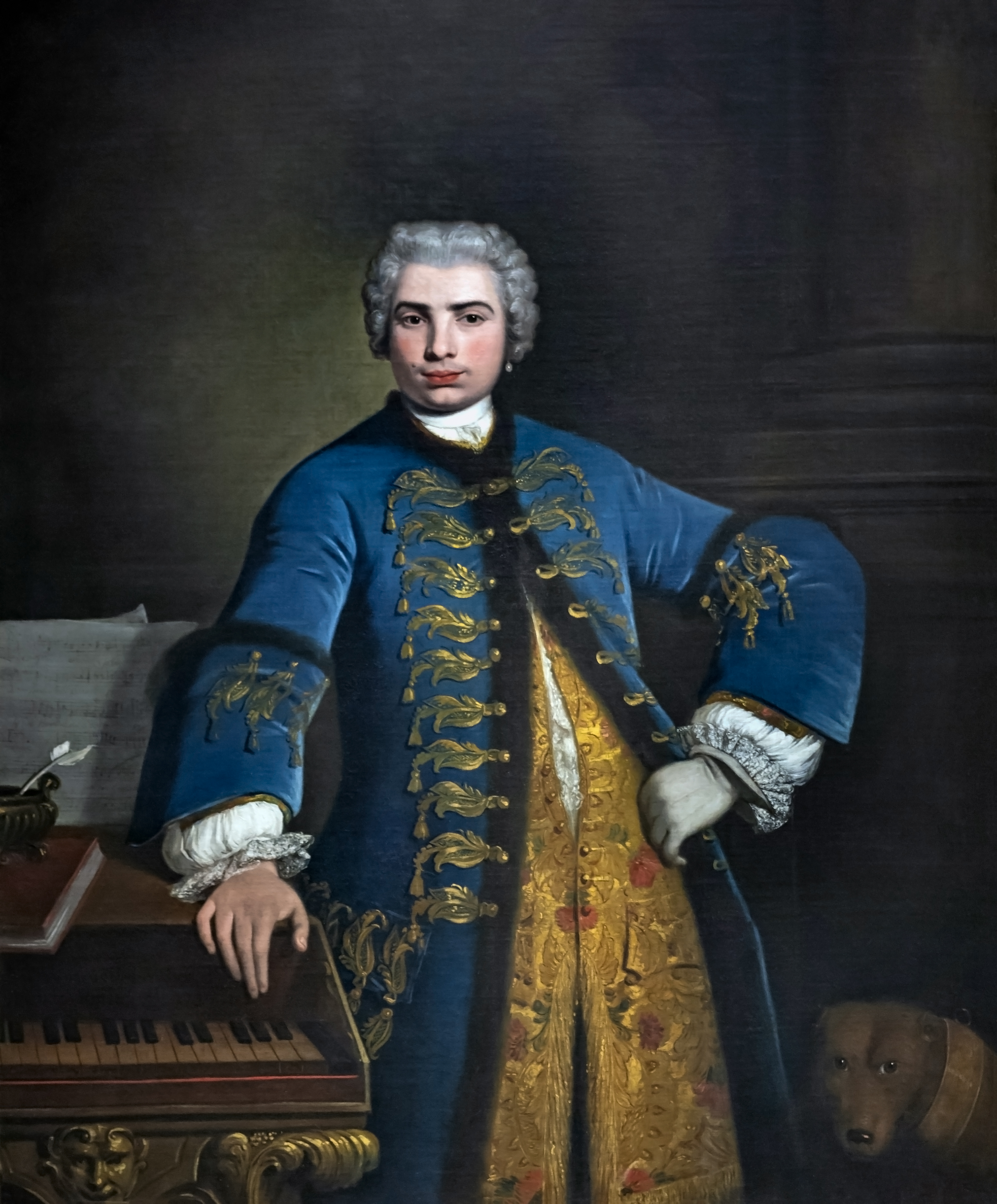
Portrait of Farinelli (Carlo Maria Michelangelo Nicola Broschi)(1705-1782)

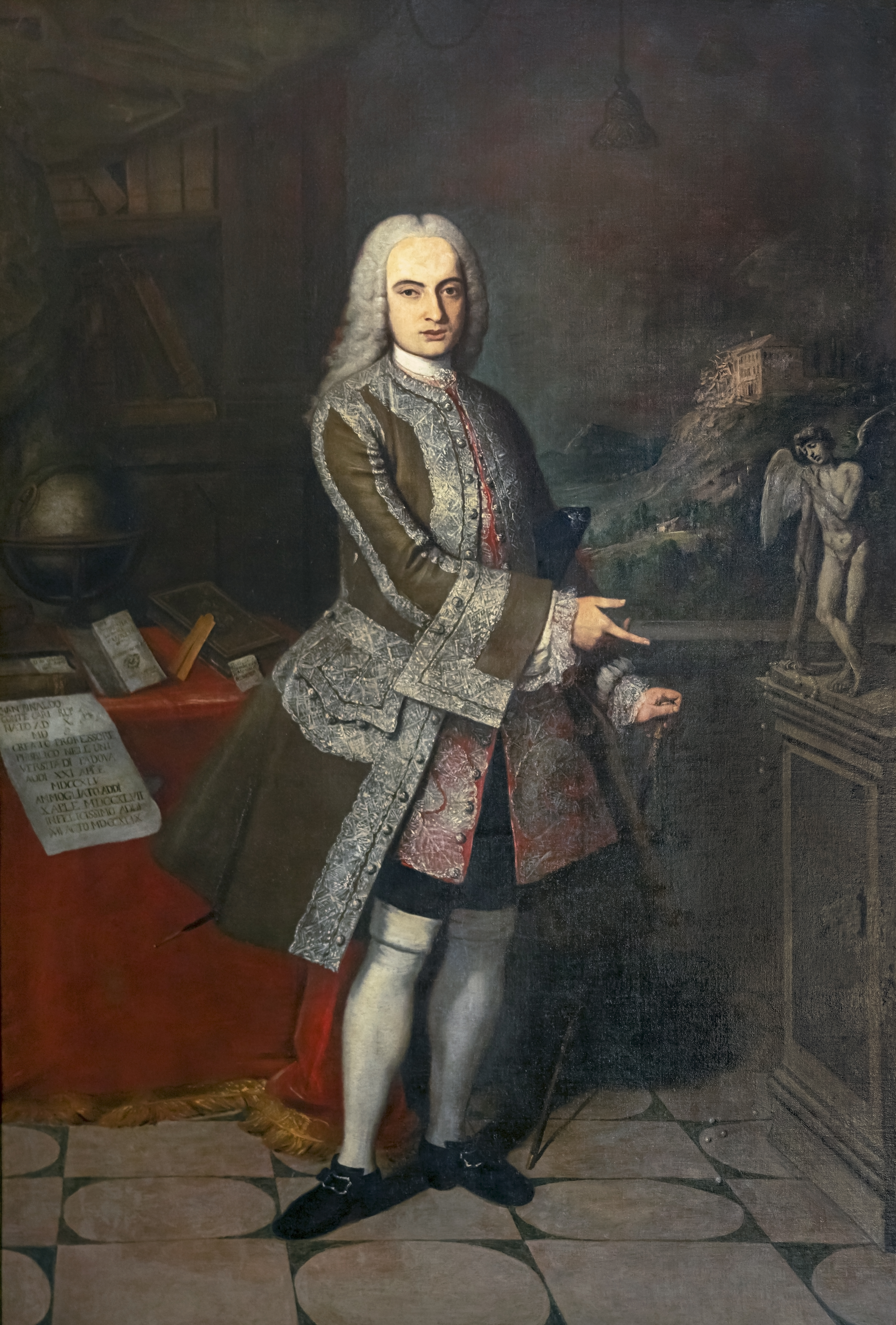
Gian Rinaldo Carli Ca' Rezzonico Venice

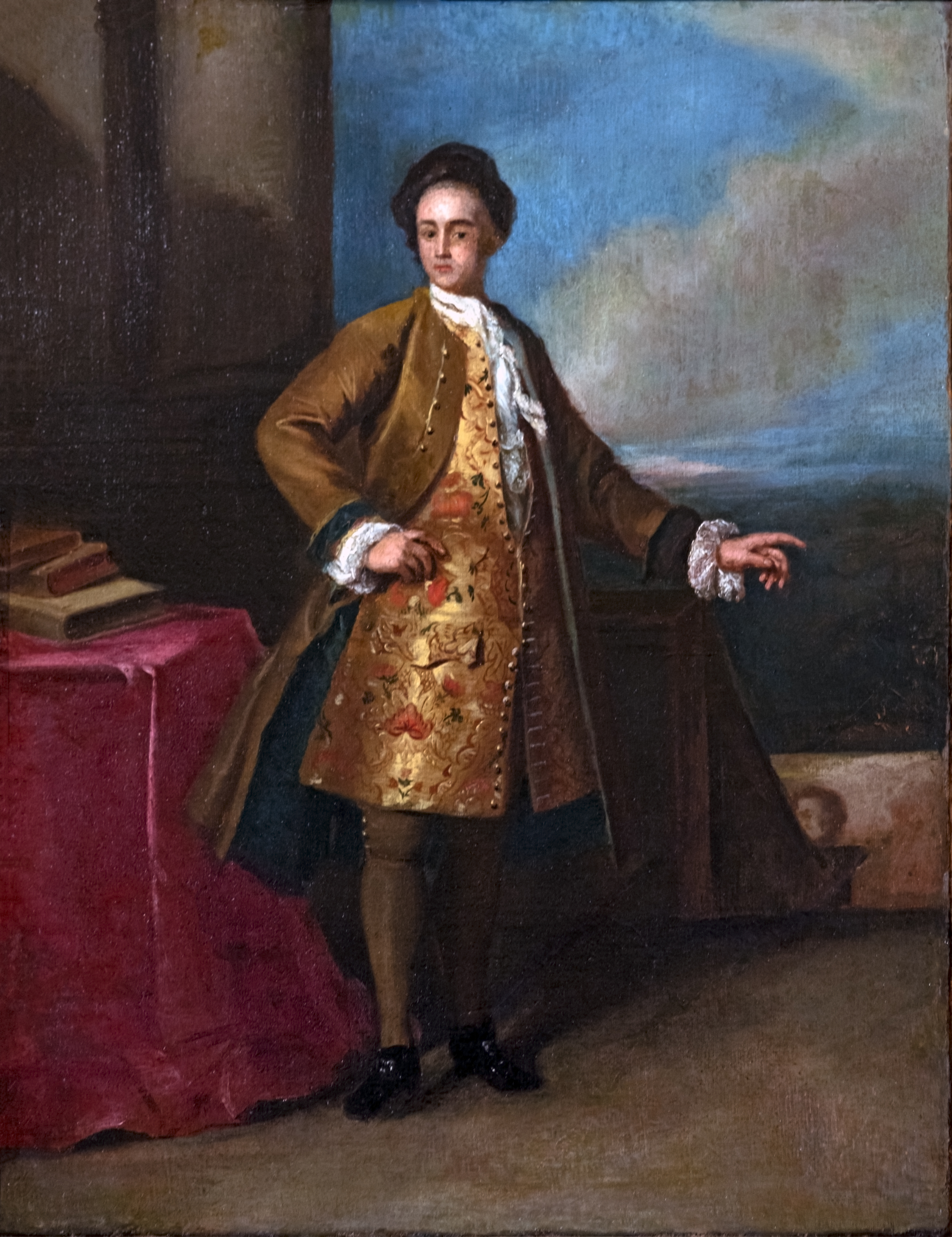
Samuel Egerton Ca' Rezzonico Venice

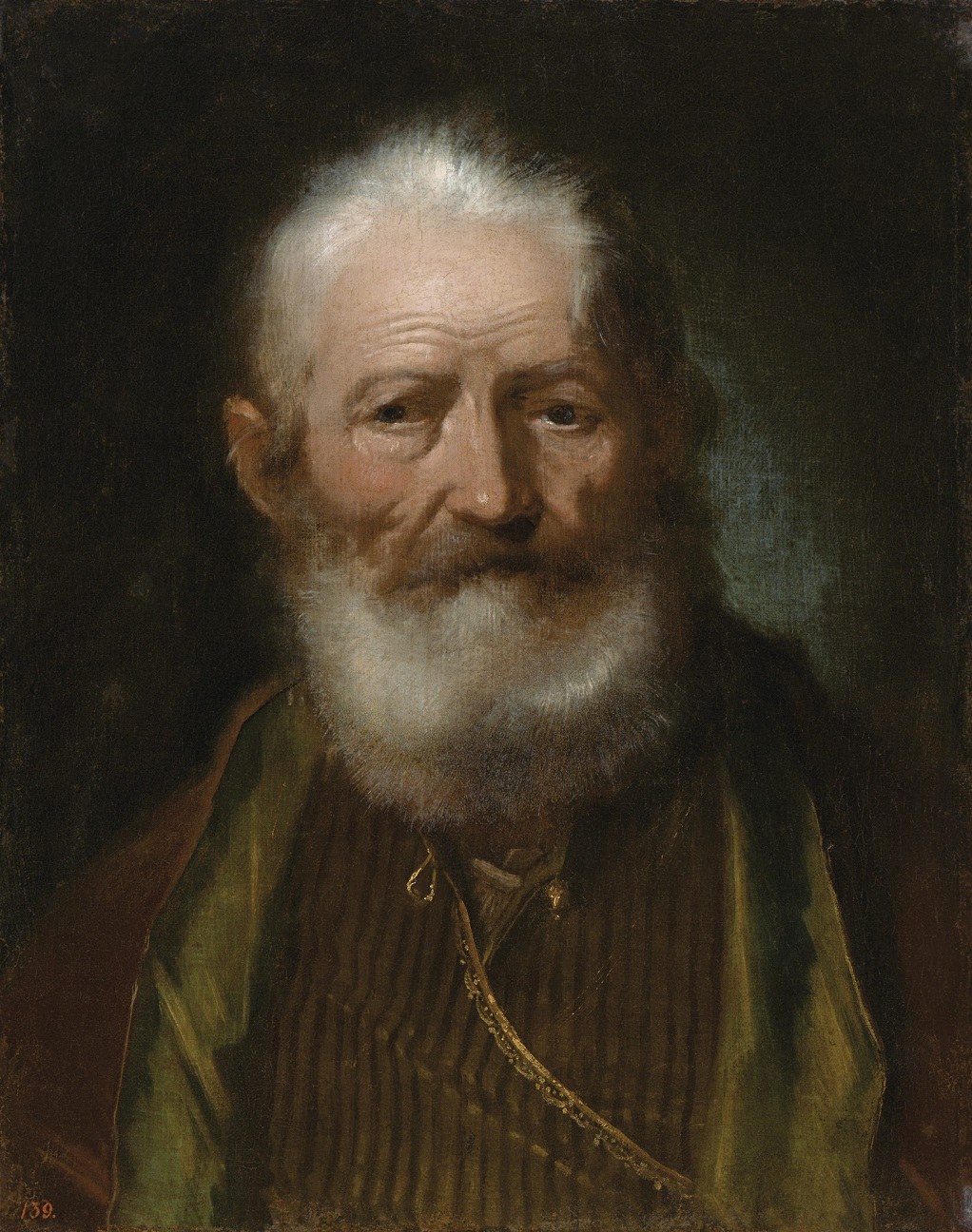
Old man in an eastern attire

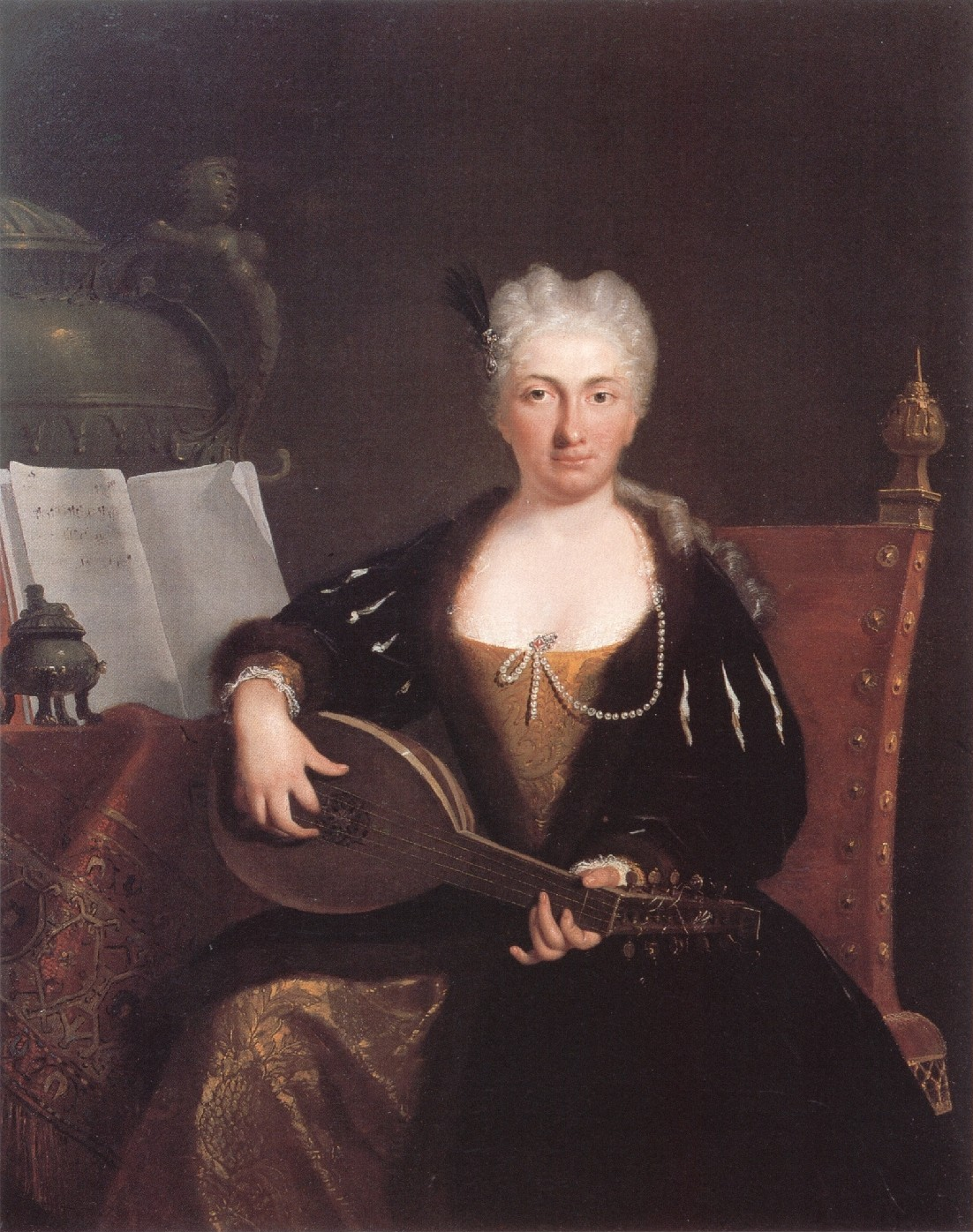
Faustina Bordoni

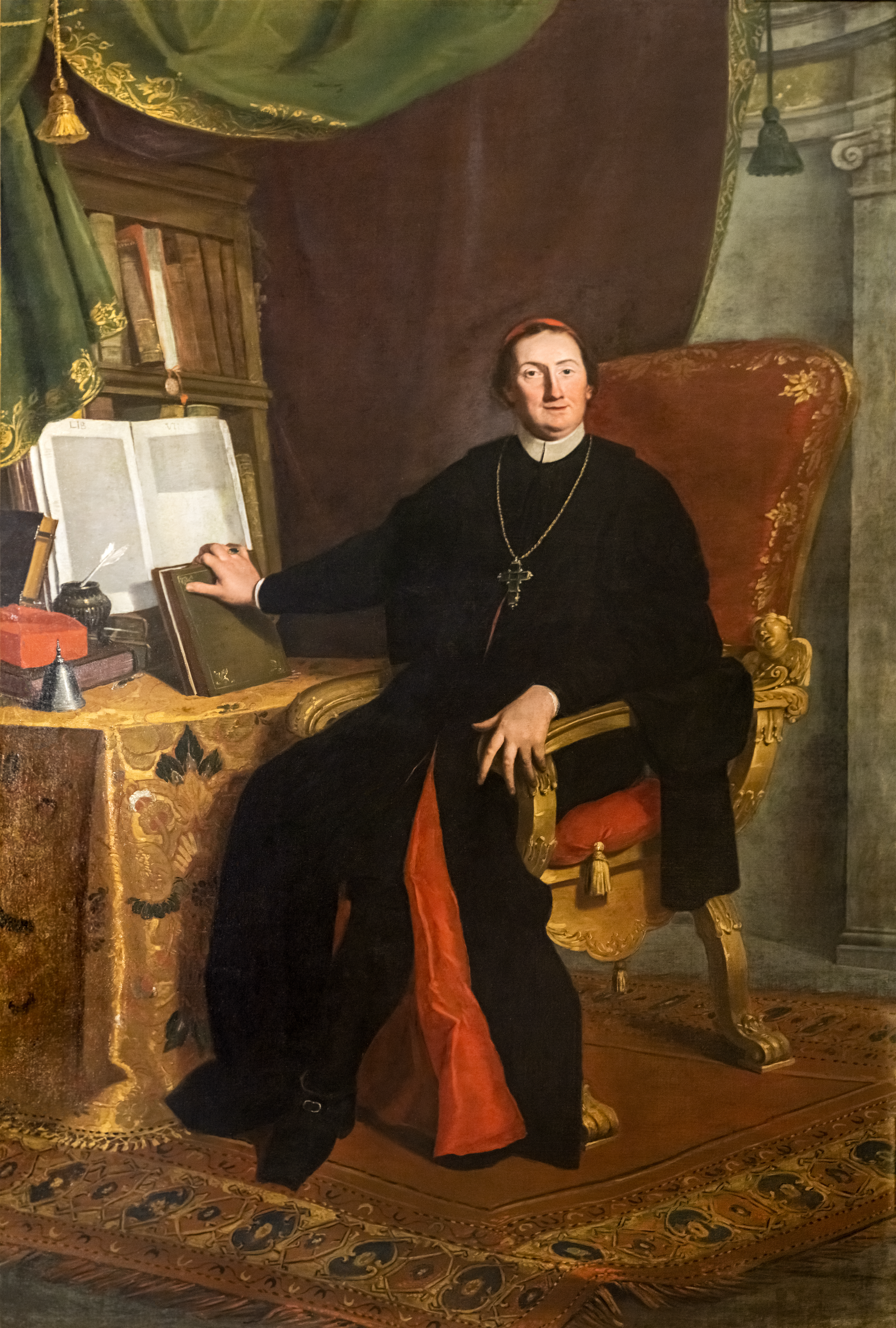
Portrait of Angelo Maria Querini

== Bibliography ==
- Watson, F.J.B. (1949). "The Nazari-A Forgotten Family of Venetian Portrait Painters". The Burlington Magazine. 91 (552): 75–79. JSTOR 870111.
- Boni, Filippo de' (1852). Biografia degli artisti ovvero dizionario della vita e delle opere dei pittori, degli scultori, degli intagliatori, dei tipografi e dei musici di ogni nazione che fiorirono da'tempi più remoti sino á nostri giorni. Seconda Edizione.. Venice; Googlebooks: Presso Andrea Santini e Figlio. p. 700.
