= Alethea Stiles =

American needleworker and correspondent (1745–1781)

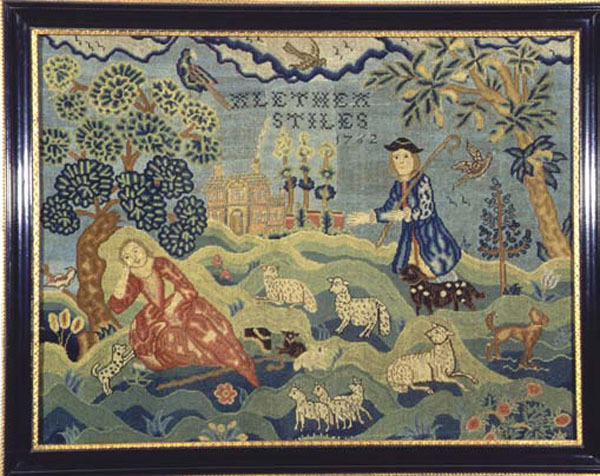
- Reclining Shepherdess by Alethea Stiles
- Born: July 9, 1745; Woodstock
- Died: January 27, 1781 (aged 35)
- Occupation: Needleworker
- Parent(s): Abel Stiles; Alethea Robinson Stiles

Alethea Stiles (July 9, 1745 – January 27, 1781) was an American needleworker and correspondent.

Alethea Stiles was born on July 9, 1745 in Woodstock, Connecticut, the daughter and only surviving child of Rev. Abel Stiles, a Congregational minister, and Alethea Robinson Stiles, a descendant of John Alden and Priscilla Mullins. Her father gave her a robust education, including teaching her Latin, which was incredibly rare for a woman to learn in colonial America. She corresponded with her older cousin, the Rev. Ezra Stiles, in both English and Latin and some of these letters are preserved in the Beinecke Library. In 1754, nine-year-old Stiles wrote to her cousin advocating for female education:

And why may not I go to colleg[e]? For my father says one Jenny Cameron put on jacket and breeches and was a good soldier. And why may not I do so and live at college? I have learned Eutropius and am now in Justin.

In 1762, she produced a needlework picture featuring a reclining shepherdess. Likely created at a Boston boarding school, Stiles stitched her name and the year at the center of the picture. The reclining shepherdess motif, taken from a European print, was a common theme employed by needlework students at Boston schools and was used to teach about courtship. Such prints are part of a group of Boston "Fishing Lady Pictures", named for another popular theme of such pictures.

== Personal life ==
On October 29, 1762, Stiles married lawyer Hadlock Marcy. They had a daughter, Sophia. Their marriage was unhappy and soon separated. Alethea Stiles died on 27 January 1781.
