= Maria Molin =

Italian artist

Maria Molin was a Venetian pastellist of the eighteenth century.

Little is known of Molin's life or career. The daughter of Marco Molin, a senator of Venice, she is identified in an inscription on one of her works as the wife of Gian Tommaso Balbi. It has been proposed on the basis of style that she was a pupil of Rosalba Carriera. Seven pastels by her hand, including a self-portrait, are currently in the collection of the Bayerisches Nationalmuseum in Munich, while another is in the collection of the Museo del Settecento Veneziano in Venice.
