= María Juana Hurtado de Mendoza =

Spanish artist (died 1818)

Doña María Juana Hurtado de Mendoza (died 1818) was a Spanish painter.

Hurtado de Mendoza, a member of the Spanish nobility was elected an academica de mérito to the Real Academia de Bellas Artes de San Fernando in 1791. She exhibited eight pastels after Guido Reni and also a pencil drawing of Minerva. It appears that she was the sister of Francisco Hurtado de Mendoza and Doña María de Loreto Hurtado de Mendoza, through whom she was the sister-in-law of violinist Francisco Balcarén y Gamot y Cristóbal de Ronda. The three were descended from an old noble family of Andalusia. Hurtado de Mendoza died in Madrid.
