= Bárbara María Hueva =

Spanish painter

- Born: 1733; Madrid, Spain
- Died: 1772 (aged 38–39)
- Education: Real Academia de Bellas Artes de San Fernando
- Known for: Painting

Bárbara María Hueva (1733–1772) was a Spanish painter.

== Life and work ==
Bárbara María Hueva was born in 1733 in Madrid. At the age of 19, in 1752, she was elected to the Real Academia de Bellas Artes de San Fernando at its first meeting. She was the first woman to obtain admittance and earned the first diploma from the academy.
