= Maria Giacomina Nazari =

Italian artist (born 1724)

Maria Giacomina Nazari (born February 10, 1724) was an Italian painter.

Born in Venice, Nazari was the daughter of the painter Bartolomeo Nazari; her brother Nazaro was also a painter. At the start of her career she copied her father's work in both oil and pastel. She produced religious scenes and portraits, and in the latter capacity was commissioned by Paolo Donado to produce a series of portraits of European rulers.
