= Marie-Geneviève Navarre =

French painter

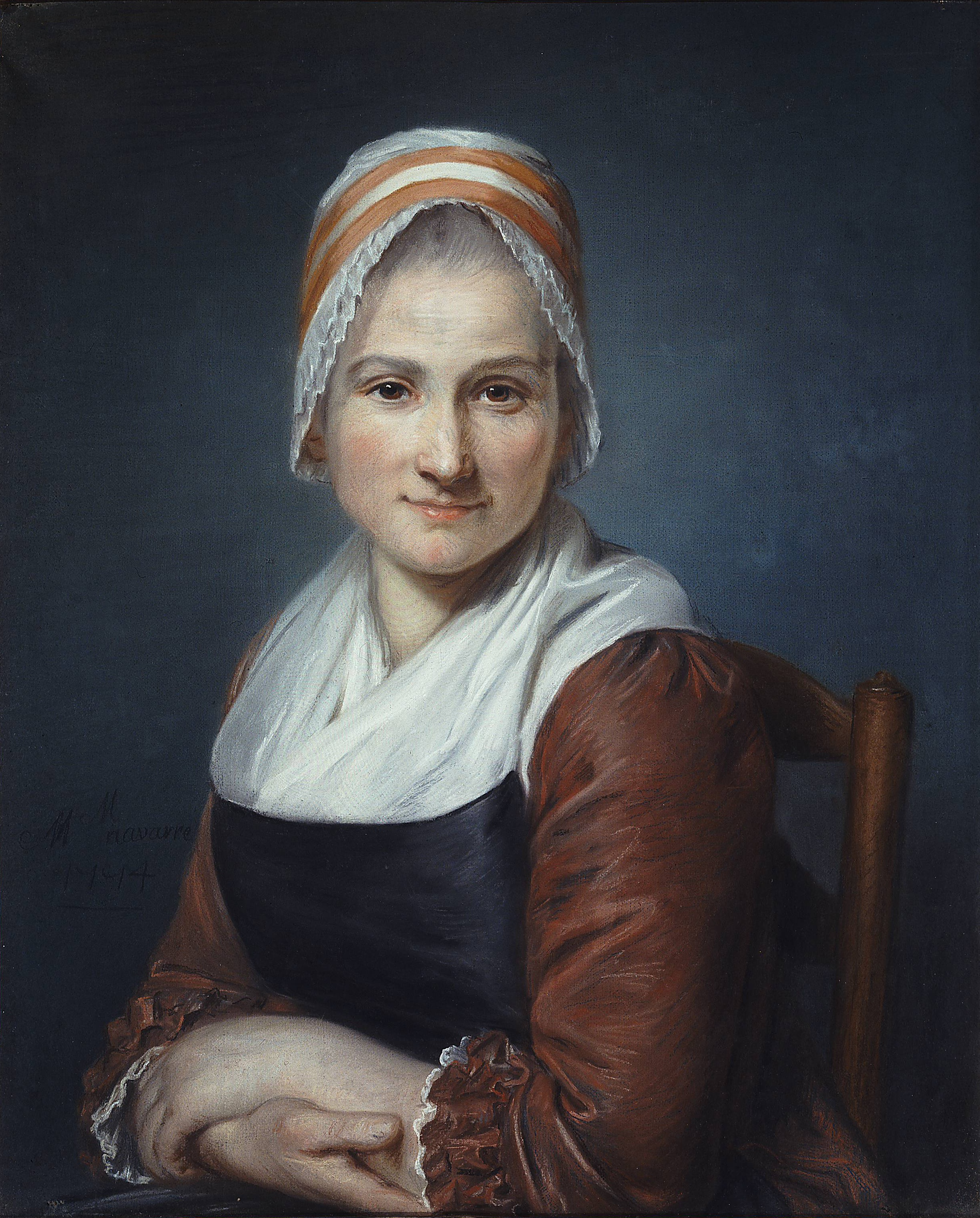
- Portrait of a Young Woman (1774), by Navarre
- Born: 1737; Paris, France
- Died: September 1795 (aged 57–58); Paris
- Other names: Antoinette-Geneviève Navarre, Geneviève Navarre
- Occupation: Painter
- Known for: Pastel works

Marie-Geneviève Navarre (1737–1795) was a French portrait artist and miniaturist who created artwork in pastels and oils, though she is best known for her pastels.

== Life ==
Navarre, also known as Antoinette-Geneviève Navarre or simply Geneviève Navarre, was born in Paris in 1737 and studied art there with the pastel master Maurice Quentin de la Tour, a royal portrait artist admired for "endowing his sitters with a distinctive charm and intelligence." With her "compelling pastel portraits," Navarre became known as one of the "most esteemed pastellists of the 18th century."

Pastel portraiture became popular in France with the arrival of Rosalba Carriera from Venice, an artist of the Italian Rococo who was in great demand in Paris for her portraits in 1720 and 1721. Navarre followed in her footsteps, and as she gained prominence, "her pastel portraits were appreciated for their skill, realism, and warmth."

In the mid-18th century, it was problematic for female artists to exhibit their work; the prestigious Académie Royale seldom admitted work created by women. Therefore, many women sought exhibition opportunities at the Académie de Saint-Luc, which was more welcoming, counting 130 women among its 4,500 artist-members. Navarre was able to exhibit her paintings and drawings on three occasions at the Académie, and twice more at the Hotel d’Aligre in the Rue St. Honoré in Paris.

A critical review of Navarre's work published in Almanach des peintres (1776), commented favorably on her 1774 Académie exhibition, which included portraits in both pastels and miniatures. The critic concluded that the pastels were "superior to her miniatures" and went on to say that "in seeing her pictures, one could assess her talent exactly, since they were executed without help – unlike those of other young ladies."

Navarre was in demand for more than her original pastels. She was also frequently engaged as a copyist to create a faithful replica of another work of art. One client request from November 1764 has been preserved.

"Is it possible for you to get me over a Copy of my picture anyhow? —If so I would write to Mlle. Navarre to make as good a Copy from it as She possibly could—with a view to do her Service here—& I wd remit her 5 Louis. I really believe, twil be the parent of a dozen portraits to her—if she executes it with the spirit of the Original in y^{r} hands—for it will be seen by half London—and as my Phyz—is as remarkable as myself—if she preserves the [Spirit] Character of both, 'twil do her honour & service too. "

Of the many works known to exist, only one pastel is known to be signed by Navarre.

== Exhibitions ==
- 1762, Académie de Saint-Luc
- 1762, Hotel d’Aligre in the Rue St. Honoré
- 1764, Académie de Saint-Luc
- 1764, Hotel d’Aligre in the Rue St. Honoré
- 1774, Académie de Saint-Luc
- 1774, Salon de la Correspondence
- 2016, National Museum of Women in the Arts

== See also ==
- Adélaïde Labille-Guiard (11 April 1749 – 24 April 1803), French portrait painter
- Élisabeth Louise Vigée Le Brun (16 April 1755 – 30 March 1842), French portrait artist
