= Alexandra Rzevskaya =

Russian writer, artist (1740–1769)

Alexandra Fedotovna Rzevskaya, née Kamenskaya (Russian: Александра Федотовна Ржевская) (1740–1769) was a Russian writer and amateur artist.

Daughter of General Fedota Mikhailovich Kamensky, she grew up on the family estate at Kamensky Saburov, near Oryol, where she learned French, Italian, painting, and music. She published poetry and an epistolary novel. Her husband, whom she married in 1766, was the poet Alexei Rzhevsky; she died in childbirth three years after they wed.
