= Margarita Gabassi =

Italian artist

Margarita or Margherita Gabassi (active mid-18th-century) was an Italian woman painter active in her native Modena, painting humorous subjects (quadri di faceto argomento). She is mentioned by Luigi Lanzi, but none of her works are found in the Pinacoteca of Modena.
