= Francisca Efigenia Meléndez y Durazzo =

Spanish artist (1770–1825)

Francisca Efigenia Meléndez y Durazzo, sometimes given as Francisca Meléndez de Múquiz (1770–1825), was a Spanish miniaturist and pastellist.

Meléndez y Durazzo was the daughter of José Agustín Meléndez, and was born in Cádiz. In 1794, she was appointed court painter. She died in Madrid.
