= Antoinette Louise Demarcy =

French painter (1788–1859)

Antoinette Louise Demarcy (1788–1859) was a French painter specialising in portraits and miniatures. Born in Paris, she was active in the French art scene throughout the early to mid-19th century, exhibiting regularly at the Salon between 1824 and 1841.

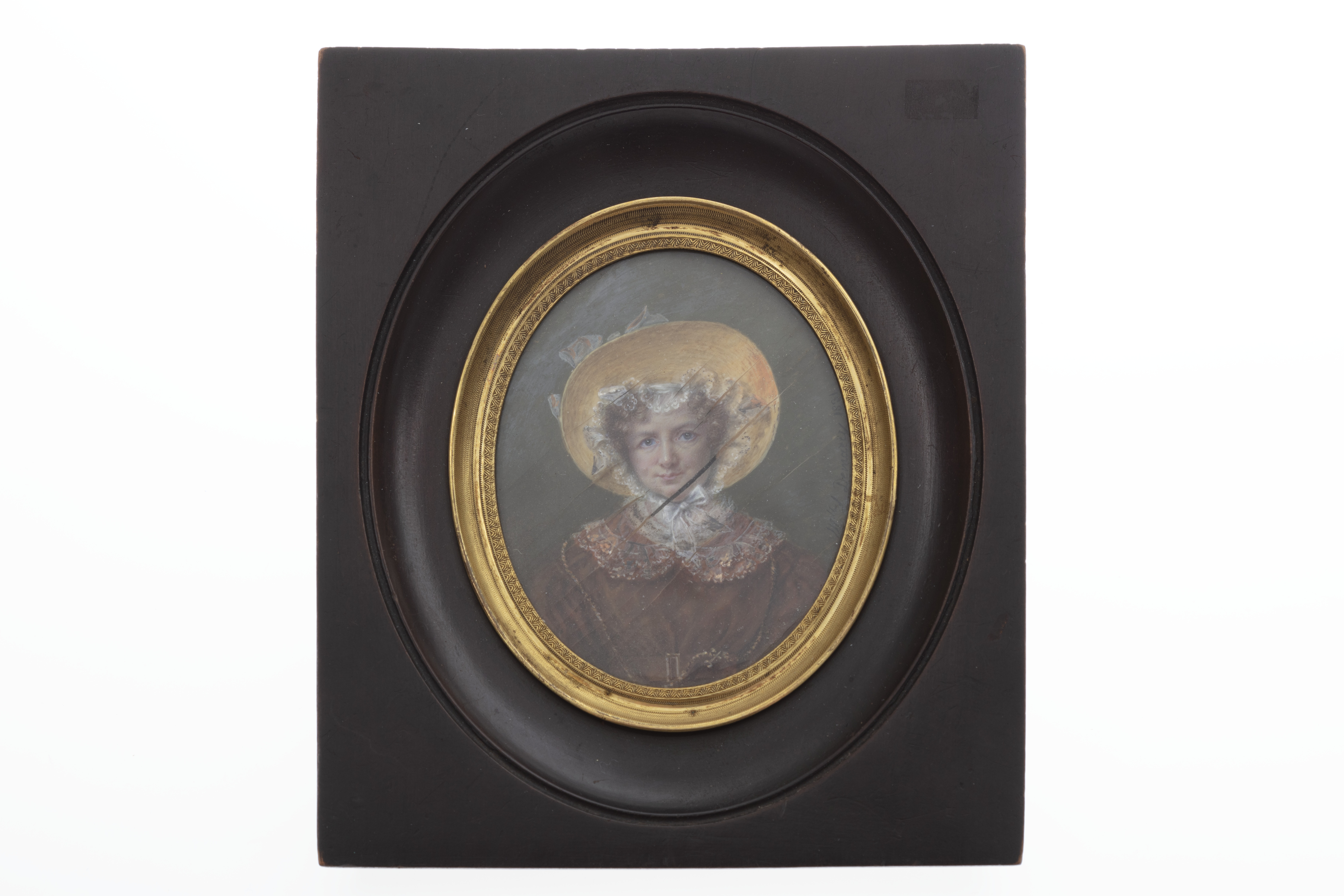
Miniature portrait of Elizabeth Brown Mullanphy by Antoinette Louise Demarcy

== Life and work ==
Demarcy was born in Paris on 25 December 1788. Her work focused primarily on portraiture, including both full-length portraits and miniatures. Among her earliest recorded works is a portrait of a doctor exhibited in 1824. Over the following years, she presented a variety of commissioned portraits, including those of Mlle A. B., an artist of the vaudeville, and several members of Parisian society. Her miniatures often depicted children and family groups, such as the children of Mme de L. and M. H., and prominent local figures including M. Gilbert, organist of Notre-Dame-de-Lorette.

In 1835, Demarcy expanded her subject matter with works such as Moisonneuse des environs de Paris, a miniature portraying a peasant harvester, demonstrating her interest in contemporary life. She continued to exhibit portraits and miniatures throughout the late 1830s and early 1840s, including full-length portraits of Mme la baronne de L. and other members of the Parisian elite.

She initially worked from a studio on Rue Neuve-Saint-Roch, close to the Louvre, before establishing herself a short distance away on Rue Saint-Honoré.

Demarcy died in Nice in 1859.
