= Sarah Williams (historian) =

English historian

Sarah Williams (1828–1861) was an English historian.

Williams is best known for her edition of the letters of John Chamberlain published by the Camden Society in 1861 after her death. Williams died of consumption on 17 June 1861 at Belgrave Street South (now Lower Belgrave Street), London.

== Works ==
- Letters written by John Chamberlain during the reign of Queen Elizabeth (London: Camden Society, 1861).
