= Seiyodo Bunshojo =

Japanese netsuke carver and haiku writer

Seiyōdō Bunshōjo (青陽堂 文章女 1764–1838) was a Japanese netsuke carver and haiku writer. She was Seiyōdō Tomiharu's daughter. Her work can be seen at the Walters Art Museum.
