= Valentino Rovisi =

Italian painter

Valentino Rovisi (December 1715 in Moena – 12 March 1783 in Moena) was an Italian painter in a late Baroque style.

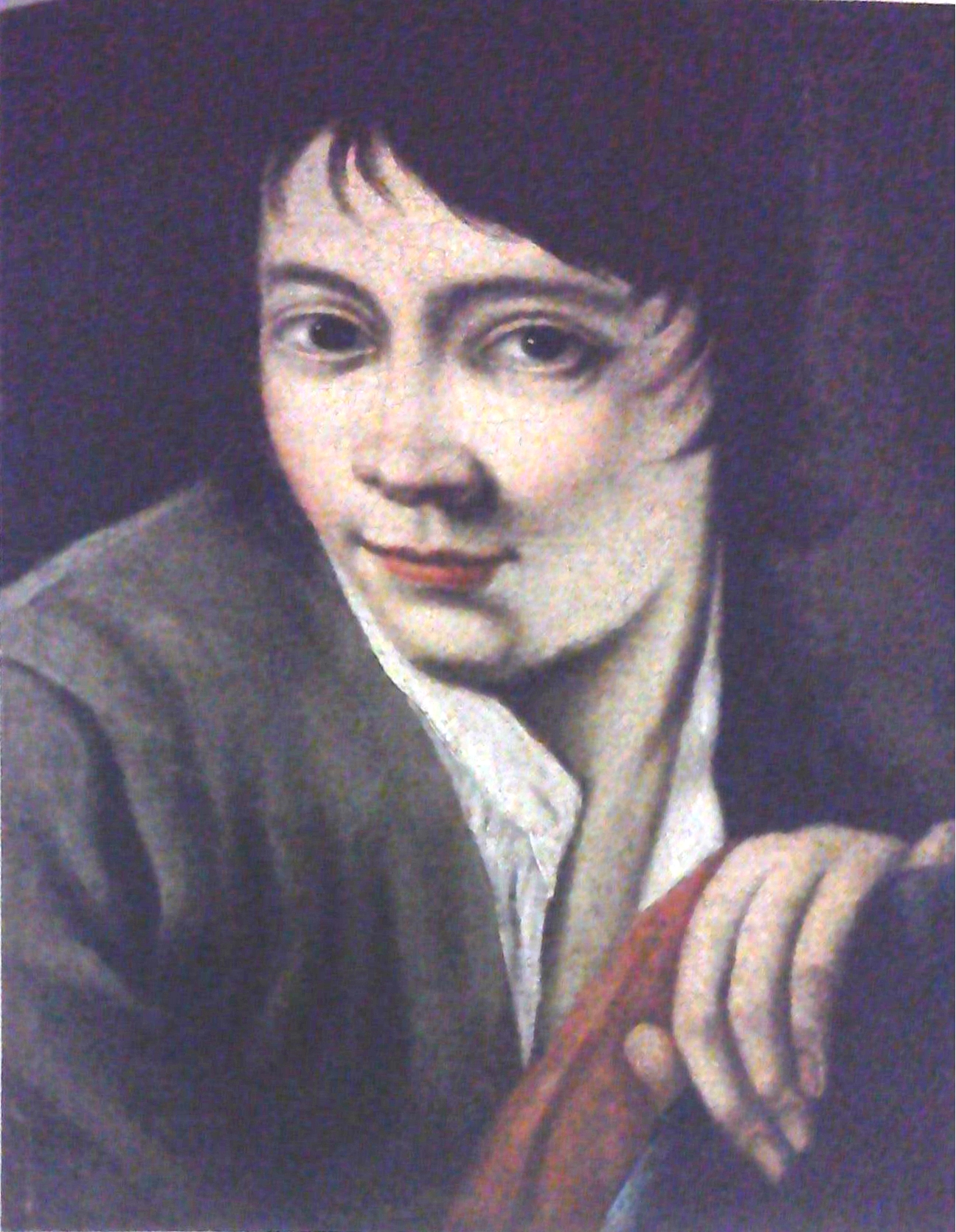
Image of Valentino Rovisi, was an Italian painter

== Biography ==
Born to a comfortable merchant of wood in the Trentine vallies, he trained with a variety of local masters including Martino Gabrielli, but by the age of 12 years, he was sent to apprentice in Venice. In Venice, he stayed for five years. It is suspected that Valentino had contacts with the studio of Tiepolo.

By 1734, he was home in Moena, but returned to Venice from 1743 to circa 1752. The second stay in Venice finds him frequently in the studio of Tiepolo. He married in Venice and three of his four children were born there. His fourth child was baptized on 18 April 1755 in Moena. By 1758 he was residing there.

In 1759 he painted frescoes in Cembra, the first for the church of San Rocco no longer exist, but the curiously unthreatening Last Judgement frescoes in the church of San Pietro remain. He painted a series of frescoes (1767) for the parish church of Santa Lucia in Grumes. In Cencenighe, he also painted some frescoes for the church. In 1773, he painted the nave ceiling, depicting the Ascension of Christ; and for the apse, the Fall of Simon Magus and Conversion of St Paul on the road to Damascus. For the sacristy of the church of Santi Pietro e Paolo in Roncegno, he painted an Adoration by the Shepherds and Samaritan at the Well.

He painted the main altarpiece of the church of San Vigilio with Saints Vigilio, Massenza, and John Nepomuk. He painted canvases depicting the Martyrdom of Giovanni Bishop of Bergamo (1745) and the Miracle of St Patrick of Ireland (1746) respectively for the Duomo of Bergamo and the church of San Giovanni di Verdara in Padua.

He painted a Resurrection of Lazarus in Moeni. He painted a series of frescoes in the nave of the church of Santa Maria Assunta in Cavedine, depicting the Miracle of the Loaves and Fishes, the Four Evangelists, the Coronation of the Virgin, the Four Fathers of the Church, and the Martyrdom of St Stephen and Lawrence. The sacristy has a fresco of the Sacrifice of Isaac. The work begun in 1779, was completed in part by Giacomo Antonio Pellegrini and also in 1783 by his daughter, Vincenza Rovisi, who helped him in all the works of his last years.

Rovisi also painted numerous commissions for private houses, often votive facade frescoes and Via Crucis depictions for the churches of San Giovanni Battista in Canale d'Agordo, Santi Pietro e Paolo in Varena, San Vigilio in Moena, and the parish church of Torcegno, work completed in 1775 with daughter.
