= Sarah Furman Warner Williams =

American artist (1764–1848)

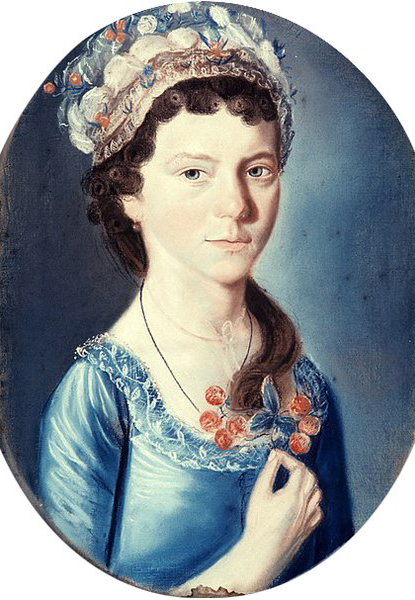
- Born: 1764
- Died: 1848 (aged 83–84)
- Known for: Needlework, embroidery

Sarah Furman Warner Williams (1764–1848) was an American embroiderer and quiltmaker. Her coverlet, which she made in 1803 to honor the marriage of her 17-year old cousin Phebe Berrien Warner to Henry Cotheal, is included in the collection of the Metropolitan Museum of Art. Needlework pieces by Williams are in the collection of the Winterthur Museum, Garden and Library.

== Gallery ==
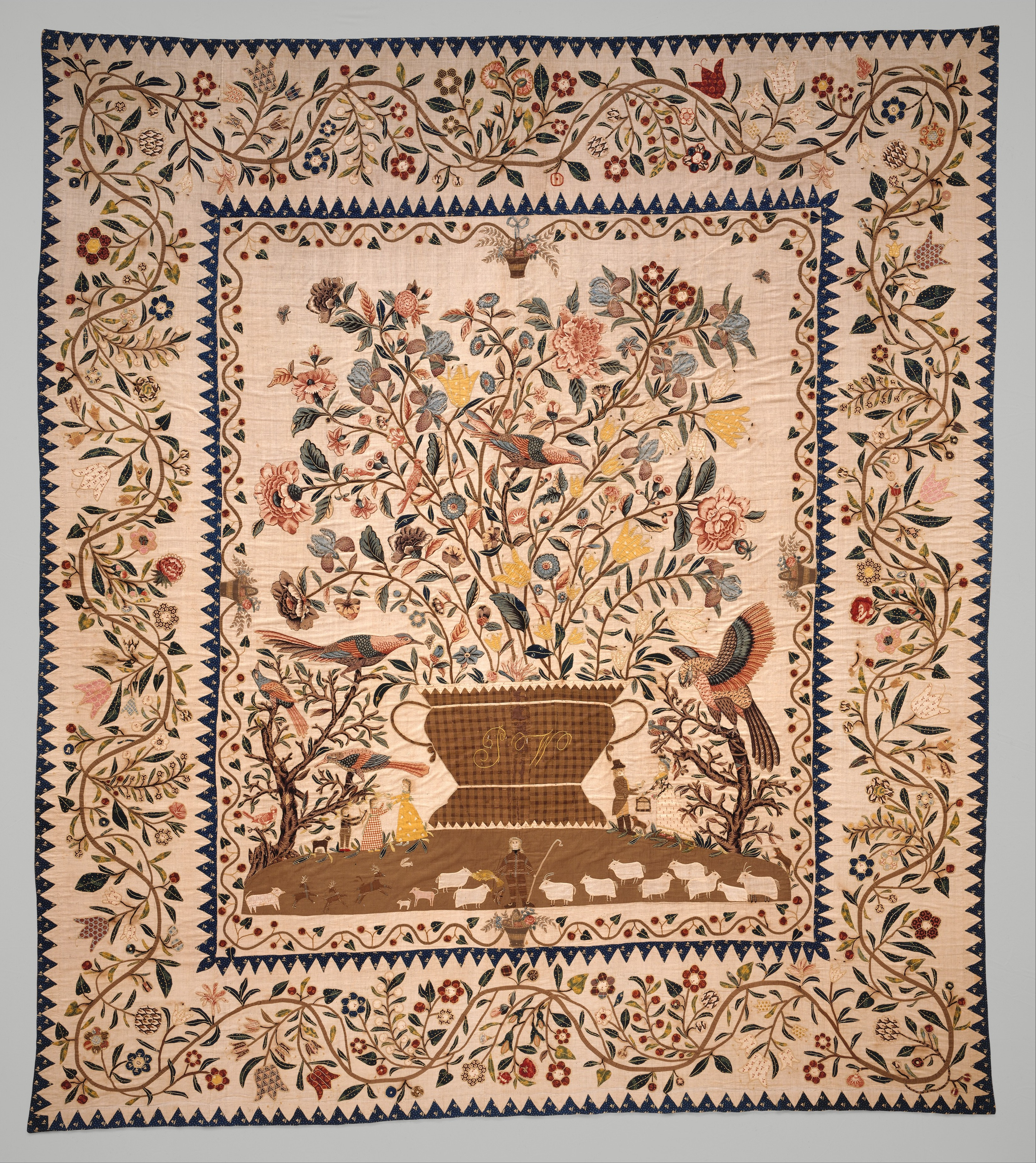
Phebe Warner Coverlet, Held in the Metropolitan Museum of Art, 103 1/4 x 90 1/2 in. (262.3 x 229.9 cm)

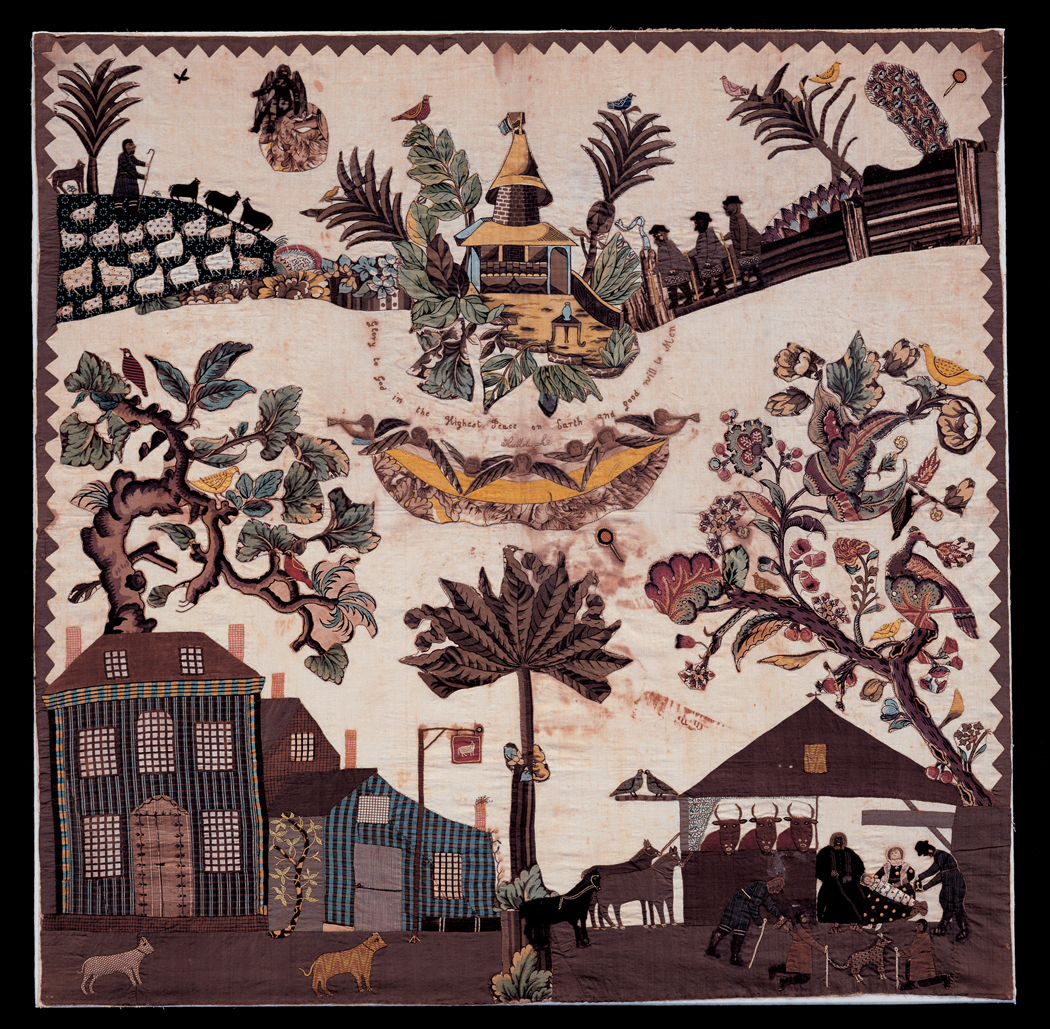
Needlework by Sarah Furman Warner Williams

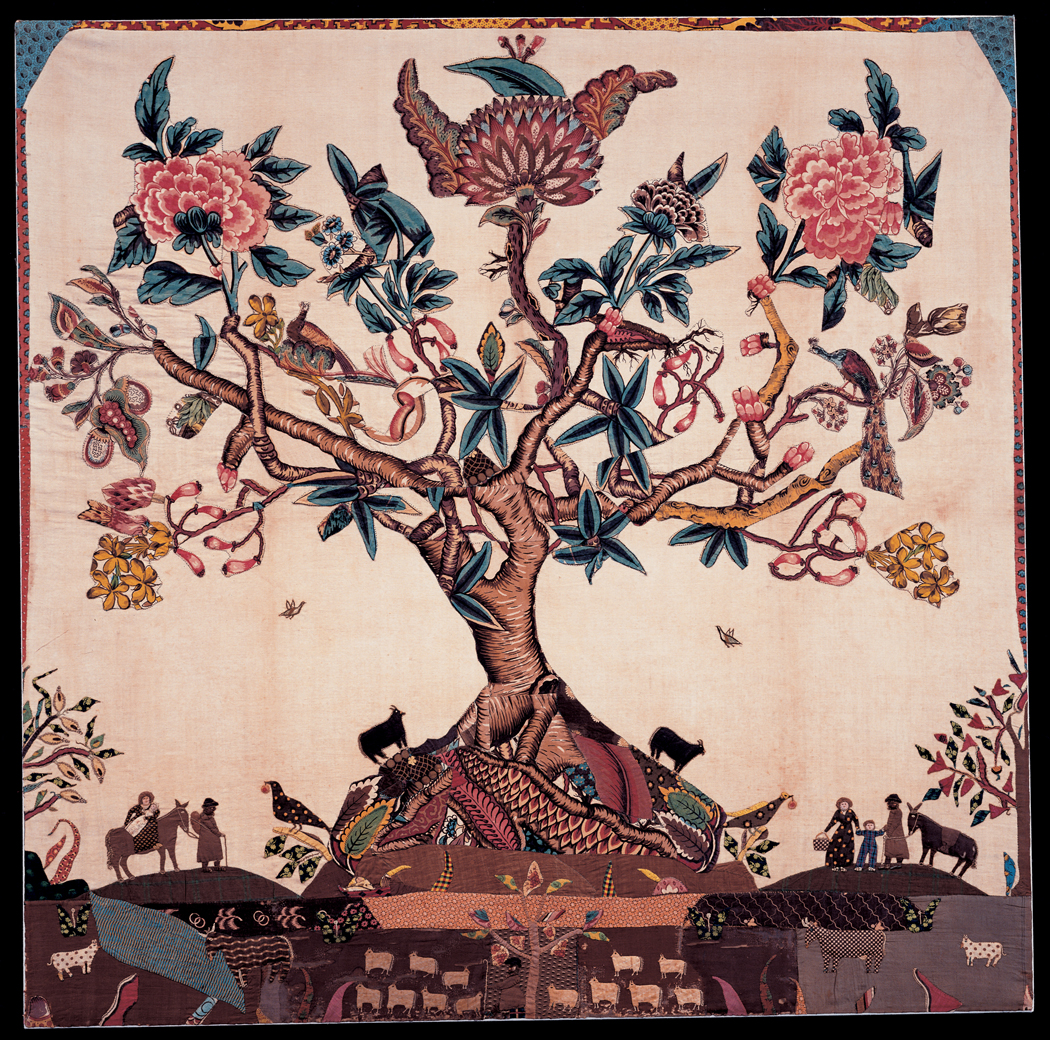
Needlework by Sarah Furman Warner Williams at the Winterthur Museum
