= Giuseppina Quaglia Borghese =

Italian artist (1764 –1831)

Giuseppina Quaglia Borghese (Turin 1764 – Turin, 17 January 1831) was an Italian painter and pastellist.

Borghese lived in Turin and was the wife of Pietro Francesco Borghese. In a 1787 poem, conte Felice Sammartino della Motta praised her abilities in pastel, but suggested that she emulate Louis Guttenbrunn and shift her focus to oil painting instead. Charles Felix of Savoy noted in a 1788 diary entry that she visited him to present him with a portrait of the princess of Piedmont. Five of her pastels, including portraits of Catherine II of Russia and Vittorio Gaetano Costa d'Arignano and a depiction of Faith after Guido Reni, were exhibited in Turin in 1820; these may have been earlier works which she still had in her possession. Borghese was the mother of Ottavia Borghese Masino di Mombello (1791-1856), who went on to exhibit artistic talent of her own. She died on 17 January 1831, 66 years old.
