= Pieter Corbeels =

Belgian book printer and resistance leader (1755–1799)

- Born: March 12, 1755
- Died: June 21, 1799 (aged 44) Tournai, French First Republic
- Allegiance: Austrian Netherlands; United Belgian States; Brabantine insurgents
- Branch: Austrian Army; Brabant revolutionary forces; Brabantian insurgents
- Service years: c. 1780s–1799
- Rank: Corporal (Austrian Army); Insurgent commander
- Commands: Brabantian insurgent units
- Conflicts: Brabant Revolution; Battle of Turnhout; French Revolutionary Wars; Peasants' War (1798)
- Spouses: Barbara Panz (died 1797) Joanna Antonia Servaes (m. 1797)
- Other work: Printer; publisher; founder of Brepols

Pieter Corbeels (12 March 1755 – 21 June 1799) was a book printer from the Austrian Netherlands a rebel when the area became part of France. He was a founder of the publishing company Brepols. He commanded part of the Brabantine forces during a revolt against the French Revolutionary regime known as the Boerenkrijg ("Peasants' War"). He was executed for his role in the war.

== Career ==
Corbeels was a corporal in the Austrian army. He fought in the rebel army of Jean-André van der Mersch, who won the Battle of Turnhout against the Austrians in 1789.

After the defeat of the Brabant Revolution, he started a printing business in Leuven in 1790. He established his printing business in the Gommarushuis in the Tiensestraat in Leuven. Corbeels printed, besides the ordinary, ordered printed papers, as well as a large number of inciting leaflets and almanacs.

For this, he was arrested by the French on 28 November 1792 and transferred to Valenciennes in France. On 15 December 1792, he was released, whereupon he resumed printing. In 1793, he moved into the house called Hertog van Brabant on the Grote Markt of Leuven.

Corbeels remarried while living in Turnhout, and he left Turnhout in the summer of 1798 as a leader of the Boerenkrijg also known as the Peasants' War (1798) against the French.

== Personal life ==
In 1796, he moved with his wife, Barbara Panz, and assistant, Philippus Jacobus Brepols, to Turnhout, where he was less impeded by the French.

On 16 September 1797, his wife died, and on 31 October, he remarried to Joanna Antonia Servaes while living in Turnhout.

His widow initially continued the printing business, together with Philippus Jacobus Brepols, but in 1800, he bought the business from her. The Brepols printing business in Turnhout grew out of this.

== Imprisonment and execution ==
On 25 November 1798, he was caught in Postel and taken by the French, whereupon he ended up in the prison and was executed, together with Albert Meulemans, on 21 June 1799 in Tournai.
