= Febelgra =

Belgian trade association

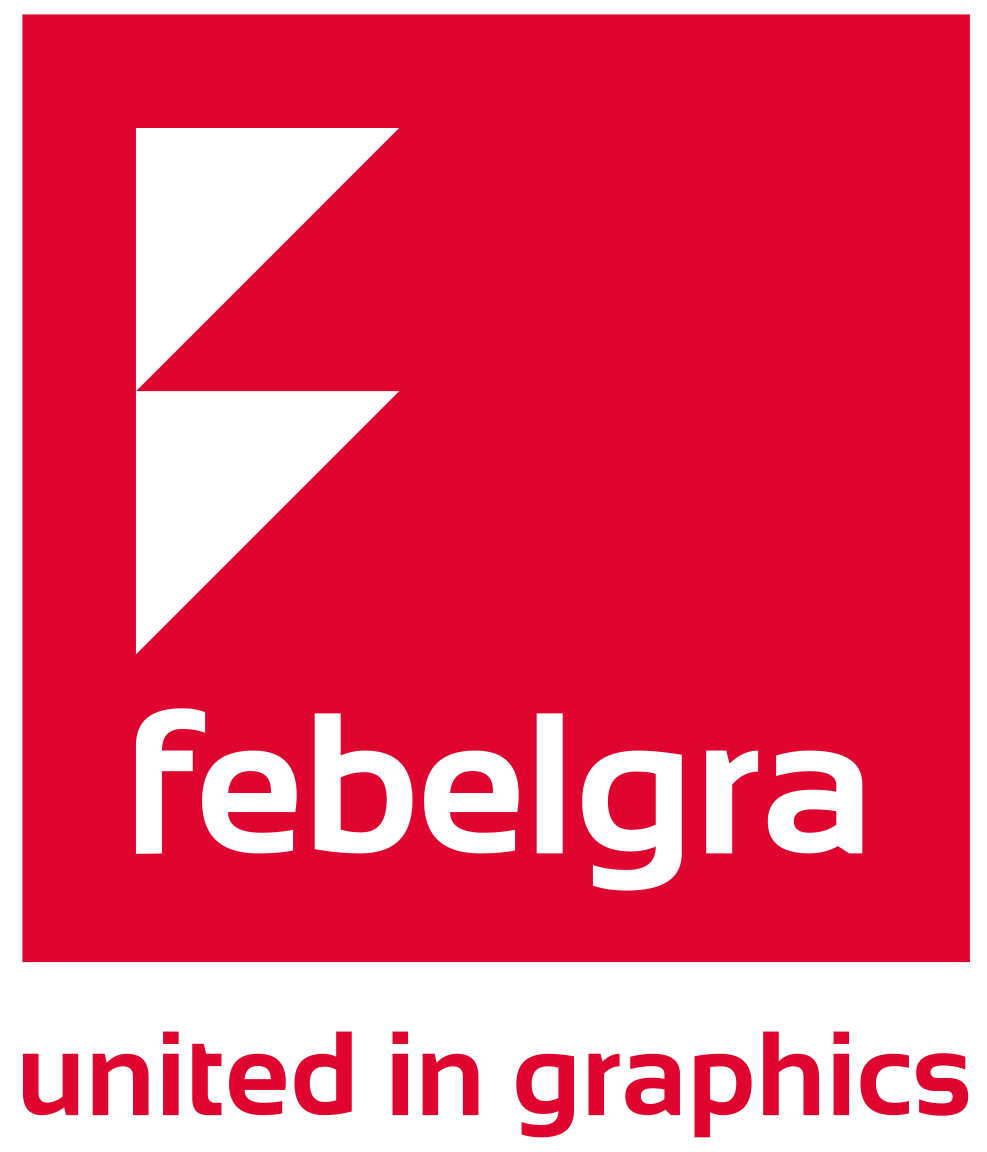
Febelgra logo

Febelgra is the federation of the Belgian printing and communication industry. The organization represents the professional printing and communication sector, and its main objective is to represent and defend the interests of its members.

== See also ==
- Brepols
- Carta Mundi
