= Biermans =

Belgian printing company

- Founder: Léonard Biermans
- Headquarters: Turnhout, Belgium
- Parent: Van Genechten Packaging

Biermans was a Belgian printing company, located in Turnhout, Belgium. It was one of several companies located in the printing valley of Turnhout.

== History ==
The company was founded by Leonard Biermans after he had been working for three years for the Brepols factory. In 1875, he started his own company to produce playing cards and colored paper, close to the railway in Turnhout, with ten employees. He married Marie-Thérèze Poupaert, daughter of Carolus F. Poupaert, who was director of the Van Genechten company.

When one of the banks, where Biermans had lent money to fund his company, went bankrupt Fr. Van Dooren and Georges Dupret provided him capital to continue his business and saved his company, AT. When Leonard Biermans died in 1897, his company was incorporated to a N.V., and Georges Dupret became the President of the company, whereas the Management Board of the company was led by Henri Van den Bosch. At that moment the company had already about 330 employees. In 1899, the Biermans factory was connected to the new electricity power supply, five years before the Brepols factory. When France levied high import taxes on Belgian paper products, Biermans started a new paper mill in Lille (France) to circumvent these import taxes. In order to start the new factory, 40 families moved from Turnhout to France and settled near Lille.

In 1930, the son of Georges Dupret, Marcel Dupret, took over the management of the company, and decided to start with the production of industrial bags and to expand the printing business and cardboard production. In 1934 the demand for playing cards on the Asian market increased, and a new factory was established in Calcutta (India), which would continue its business until the independence of India. In 1960, the company Copa was founded, which became a strong competitor on market for special paper. When the market for special paper decreased, several paper manufacturers from the Turnhout region, Copa, Mesmaekers, Biermans and Van Genechten, founded Turpa. In 1970 Biermans, together with Brepols and Van Genechten, founded Carta Mundi as a joint venture. In 1971, Biermans was acquired by Van Genechten, to create Van Genechten Biermans (VGB).

== See also ==
- Flemish Innovation Center for Graphic Communication

== Sources ==
- De Turnhoutse Kempen, haar economische en sociale betekenis, Vlaams Economisch Verbond, pp. 88–90
- Biermans (Dutch)
