= Battle of Turnhout =

The Battle of Turnhout, named after the city of Turnhout in northern Belgium, may refer to:

- Battle of Turnhout (1597), a battle of the Eighty Years' War between an Anglo-Dutch force and Spain
- Battle of Turnhout (1789), a battle between Austrian and Belgian rebels during the Brabant Revolution
- Battle of Turnhout (1831), a battle between Belgian and Dutch armies during the Ten Days' Campaign
