= Van Genechten Packaging =

Belgian printing company

- Headquarters: Turnhout, Belgium

Van Genechten Packaging is a Belgian printing company, located in Turnhout. It is one of the companies of the printing valley located around Turnhout, Belgium.

== History ==
One of the originators of the company, J.E. Glénisson was born in Keeken, Germany, in 1808. His father married the sister of the wife of Philippus Jacobus Brepols. J.E. Glénisson studied in Saint-Omer (France) and came to work afterwards in the Brepols factory of his uncle in Turnhout. In 1830, he was promoted to first clerk. He married with C.A. Peeters. When in 1833 P.J. Brepols introduced his son-in-law into the company, Glénisson saw his chances to reach the top of the company evaporate, and started together with Antoine Van Genechten their own printing business in the Hofstraat in Turnhout.

They specialized themselves in the same products as Brepols, which of course lead to fierce competition. In 1837, they moved their company to the Warandestraat. On 2 January 1839 they founded their own magazine, the L’abeille de la Campine. This French-speaking magazine was not a success and after three years, as from January 1842, they changed it into a Flemish magazine De Kempische Bie, which lasted until 30 December 1843. In 1841 Glénisson and Van Genechten had about 80 employees, and in 1847 they had about 155 employees.

In 1855, the company Glénisson & Van Genechten was dissolved and Glénisson & Van Genechten established their own company. Glénisson remained in the factory in the Warandestraat and Van Genechten set up a new building in Den Dijk, now Merodelei, in Turnhout: Etabl. Antoine Van Genechten. The new company continued to produce the same products as its competitors.

On 15 December 1868 the company got a license for pressing Chinese playing cards and in 1869, the factory was expanded. The printing of comics (kinderprenten) was discontinued in 1870 and the printing blocks were sold to Beersmans-Pleek. On 14 July 1874, Antoine Van Genechten died and the company was continued by his oldest son-in-law, Jean De Somer. The company's business expanded greatly, which was rewarded with honors at expositions in Belgium and abroad. In 1909, the company was incorporated into a N.V.. In 1912, Jan-Antoon De Somer succeeded his father and his brother, Paul De Somer, joined the management board of the company. In the meantime the company had started with the printing on packaging, and also specialised in printing of playing cards with publicity. In 1970 Van Genechten, together with Brepols and Biermans, founded Carta Mundi as a joint venture. In 1971, Van Genechten acquired Biermans, to create Van Genechten Biermans (VGB).

== Sources ==
- Glénisson & Van Genechten (Dutch)
- Etabl. Antoine Van Genechten (Dutch)
