= François du Four =

Belgian industrialist

Baron François du Four

Mayor of Turnhout
- In office 1919–1932

Personal details
- Born: 1871 Turnhout, Belgium
- Died: 1945 (aged 73–74)
- Spouse: Germaine Herry (m. 1902)
- Children: 8
- Occupation: Industrialist
- Known for: Owner of Brepols

Baron François du Four (Turnhout, Belgium, 1871 – 1945) was a Belgian industrialist.

When his mother, Josephina Frederika Dessauer, died in 1904, he became the owner of the family business Brepols, a paper – and playing card factory. The company at that moment had about 1000 employees. From 1919 up to 1932 François du Four was mayor of Turnhout. In 1929, King Albert I of Belgium knighted him and granted him the title of baron. The heraldic motto of the du Fours is Melius esse quam vider, which means it is better to be than to seem, and their own weapon-shield represents a lion.

In Turnhout there is a street named after him: the baron François du Four street, which starts on the central market place of Turnhout. In this street the old factory buildings of Brepols were located. In 1945, Francois du Four died at the age of 74.

François du Four liked racing-horses. His thoroughbreds won a lot of races and a lot of prize money. After he died, regretfully, all his horses were sold. In 1904, he had bought a small farm in Retie with neighboring pasture. He was especially looking for a place where he could breed thoroughbreds. In 1905, he started with the construction of the park where now the castle of Retie stands. In 1906, he started the building of a castle and the stables for his horses.

== Personal life ==
du Four married Germaine Herry in 1902, and together they had seven daughters and a son.

== Sources ==
- Walter Raeymakers, Baron François du Four. Een leven tussen drukpersen renpaarden en politiek, Turnhout, Brepols, 1995.
