= Imperial Austrian Army =

Imperial Austrian Army may refer to:

- Imperial Army of the Holy Roman Emperor (1619–1745)
- Austrian Army during the French Revolutionary and Napoleonic Wars (1745–1806)
- Imperial Austrian Army (1806–1867)

== See also ==
- Imperial-Royal Army (disambiguation)
- Austrian army (disambiguation)
