= Brepols =

Belgian publisher

- Founded: 1795
- Founder: Pieter Corbeels and Philippus Jacobus Brepols
- Country of origin: Belgium
- Headquarters location: Turnhout
- Distribution: Licap (Belgium); Sofédis (France); Marston Book Services (UK); ISD (United States)
- Publication types: Books, journals, databases
- Imprints: Harvey Miller Publishers
- Official website: www.brepols.net (publisher)

Brepols is a Belgian publishing house. Once, it was one of the largest printing companies in the world and one of the main employers in Turnhout (Belgium). Besides its printing business, Brepols is also active as a publisher. Formerly well known for its missals, the company is now better known for its specialization in historical studies and editions of classical authors, including the Corpus Christianorum.

== History ==
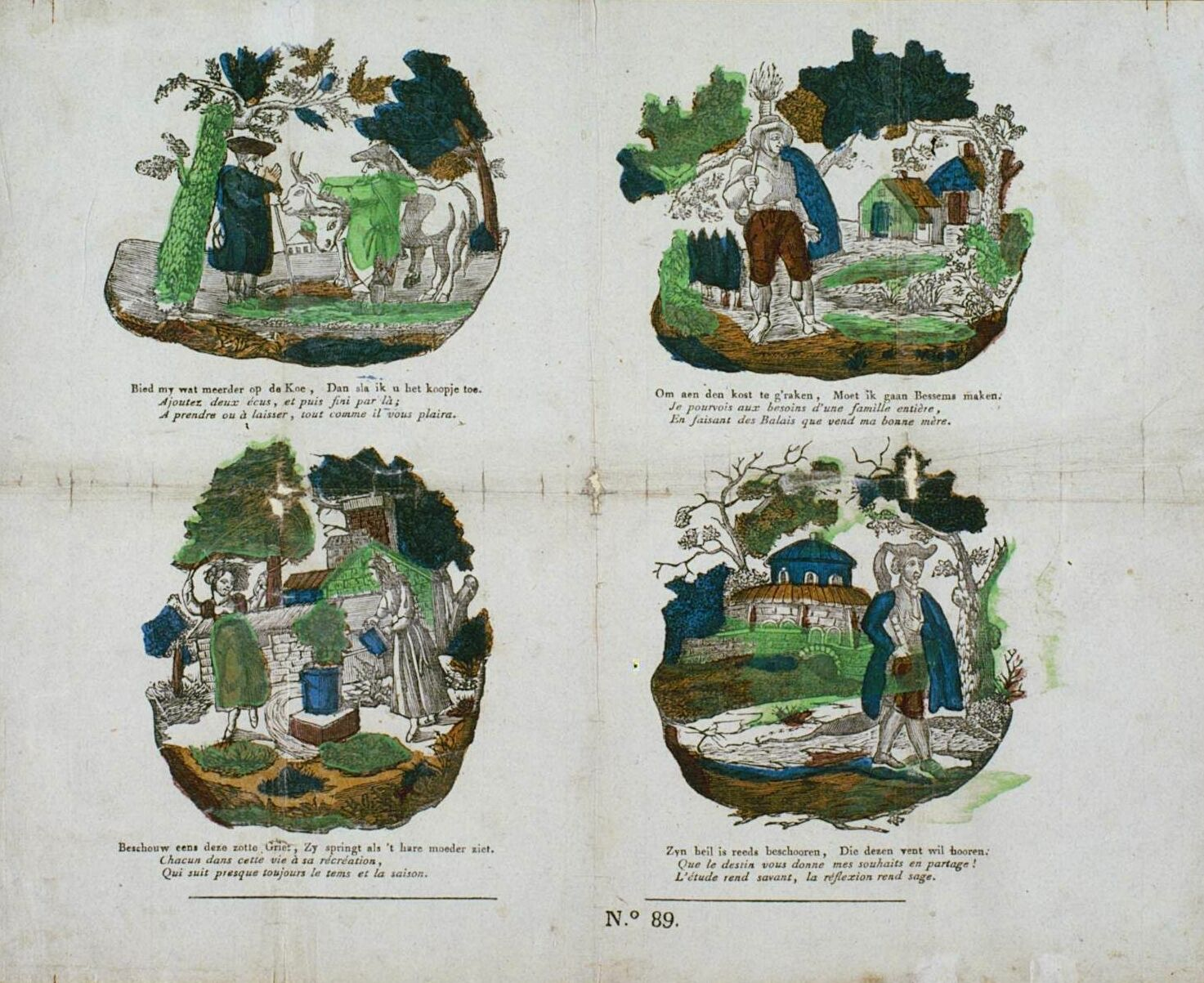
Zeeuwse Bibliotheek: Bied my wat meerder op de koe, dan sla ik u het koopje toe

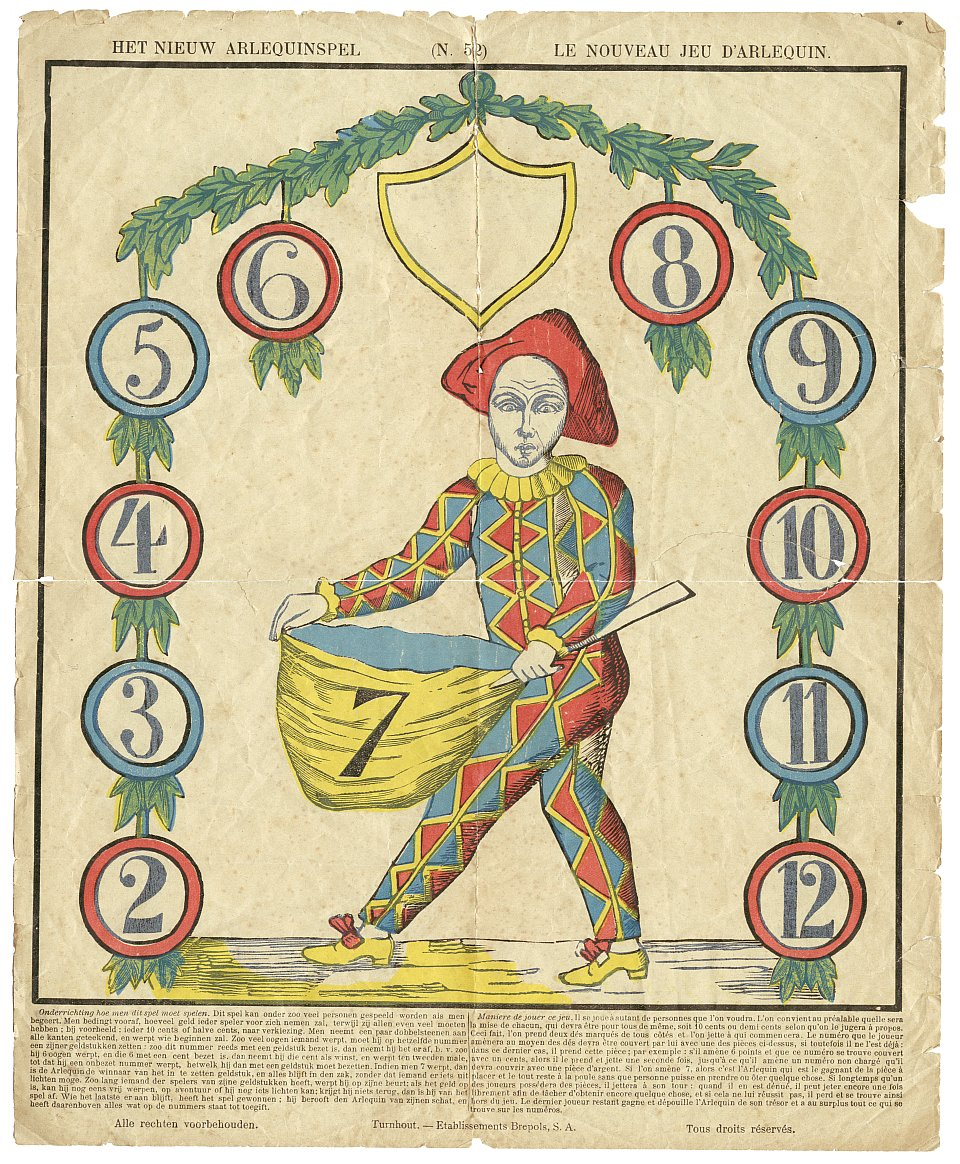
"Het nieuw arlequinspel", number 7

In 1795, Pieter Corbeels, a printer from Leuven, moved to Turnhout together with his assistant Philippus Jacobus Brepols, possibly to flee the French army, which occupied Belgium at that time. Corbeels rapidly became the town printer, and he printed passports and pamphlets for the city of Turnhout. In the summer of 1798, Corbeels went to fight against the French as one of the leaders of the ‘’Boerenkrijg’’. He was caught and executed.

Because of Corbeels' fight against the French, his apprentice, Philippus Jacobus Brepols, had to take over responsibility for the printing company. Corbeels' widow managed the business for a short while, but from 1800 onwards P. J. Brepols gradually took over the house and the business.

Soon the printing business was expanded with bookbinding, and a shop and paper trade were added to the business as well. Initially, P. J. Brepols traded the most diverse goods, from leatherware to hats. Religious works and schoolbooks were printed, especially in the first few years. In 1817, Brepols acquired the company Le Tellier in Lier, from which he had bought comics for children for a long time. Between 1817 and 1930, Brepols published about 623 comics for children.

Playing cards, at the time, were printed in Antwerp, Brussels, and mainly in Dinant, but as of 1826, Brepols started printing playing cards and soon became the most important producer of them. Brepols also started to produce special types of paper. The then still rather new method of lithography was introduced at Brepols in 1829. When Belgium became independent in 1830, the business to the Netherlands was lost. On 5 July 1834 the company started the first magazine of the Kempen (E: Campine), the ‘’Algemeen Aenkondigingsblad’’, which was printed by Brepols up to 1875.

On 3 January 1845, P. J. Brepols died and the company was continued by his only daughter, Antoinette Brepols, who had married Jan Jozef Dierckx, a merchant, in 1820. On 4 May 1835 P.J. Brepols had announced that his son-in-law would enter the family business, which would then become Brepols & Dierckx Son. When P. J. Brepols died in 1845, his daughter was already a widow. She was assisted by Stefan Splichal, who mainly managed the publication of the ’Algemeen Aenkondigingsblad’’. In 1853 the first steam engine was introduced in the company.

In 1860, the son of Antoinette, Jan Willem Dierckx, married Josephina Frederika Dessauer, the daughter of an industrialist from Aschaffenburg (Germany). When Jan Willem died in 1866, his widow Josephina became the head of the Brepols Company. In 1868 she remarried with Arthur Dufour, an engineer, who did not involve himself very much in the business of his wife. At the beginning of the twentieth century, their son, baron François du Four took over the family business from his mother. In the meantime the company had grown to become the biggest of its kind in Belgium and had about 1000 employees.

In 1911, the company was incorporated into the N.V etablissementen Brepols and François du Four became President of the Management Council of Brepols. In 1913, and 1930, the buildings of the company were enlarged, while previously already new buildings had been built in 1887 and 1890, in the Papenstraat in Turnhout. At the beginning of 1921 a new department was established for the printing of wallpaper. In 1929, the production of wallpaper by Brepols had already amounted to six millions rolls.

To overcome the trade restrictions imposed by the customs authorities of the United Kingdom and France in 1932, in Halluin (France) the Société Française des Papiers Brepols was created, in order not to lose this important market. In 1945, baron François du Four died and his son Jean du Four succeeded him as President of the Management Council of the company. The special paper production were grouped, in 1960, in a new company, the N.V Copa, in which three companies of Turnhout merged their business. In 1967, this business activity was taken over by the newly established company N.V Turpa, together with the departments for colored paper of Biermans, Van Genechten and Copa. In 1970, Brepols, Biermans and Van Genechten brought together their playing card business and created the company Carta Mundi as a joint venture, a world leader in the production of playing cards.

More and more the company printed and bound books for other companies, due to the large decline of the need for church books caused by the Second Vatican Council. When the location of an industrial building in the centre of the city of Turnhout could no longer be justified, an area of 7 hectares was bought in an industrial area outside the city and the first construction phase of the new building started in June 1969. In 1971, baron Louis de Cartier de Marchienne took over as the President of the Management Council. Under his leadership, the second phase of the work was completed in 1973, so that in 1974 the company moved to its new location. The site was further extended in 1989 for the expansion of the company.

But the tide turned and the company, which employed at its heyday some 2200 people, was split up in 4 separate smaller companies. In 2003, two companies of the group filed for bankruptcy. The publisher and a part of the book binding activity continue to exist. At present it employs still about 200 people.

In academic circles Brepols is particularly well known as the publisher of Greek patristic and medieval Latin works (in the Continuatio Mediaevalis) in the Corpus Christianorum series, which is in some respects seen as the successor to Migne's Patrologiae cursus completus.

Brepols has also published the third (of five) sub-series of the bilingual German patristic and medieval collection Fontes Christiani; the other four sub-series are published by Herder

== Sources ==
- Brepols (history)
- Brepols (history)
- Roland Baetens (Ed.), Harry de Kok, Pierre Delsaerdt, Gerrit de Vijlder and Ludo Simons, Brepols drukkers en uitgevers 1796–1996, Brepols, 1996.
