= Rugbyclub Turnhout =

Belgian rugby union club, based in Turnhout

- Nickname: The Aces
- Founded: 2008; 18 years ago
- Location: Turnhout, Belgium
- Chairman: Kris Wouters
Team kit

Rugbyclub Turnhout is a Belgian rugby club in Turnhout.

== History ==
The club was founded in 2008 by students from Sint Jozefcollege, inspired by their teacher, former Italian rugby professional Max Icardi. There was at the time no rugby union club in Turnhout. An earlier club, called The Jokers Turnhout was defunct.
