= Copag =

Brazilian playing card manufacturer

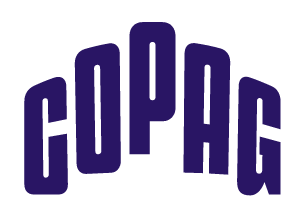
- Type: Subsidiary
- Industry: Playing cards
- Founded: 1908; 118 years ago
- Headquarters: São Paulo, Brazil
- Parent: Cartamundi Group
- Website: www.copag.com.br/en

Selection of Copag Big Index Export

Copag is a company based in São Paulo, Brazil. It started as a printing company in 1908. The company expanded to making playing cards for poker and bridge in 1918. Plastic playing cards with a PVC finish are their primary product. With the poker boom of the mid-2000s, Copag's business has quickly grown. In 2005, the World Series of Poker slated Copag as their official playing card supplier. That same year, Copag became part of the Cartamundi Group.
