= Zuster Maria-Jozefa =

Belgian nun, educator and poet (1883–1961)

Sister Maria-Jozefa
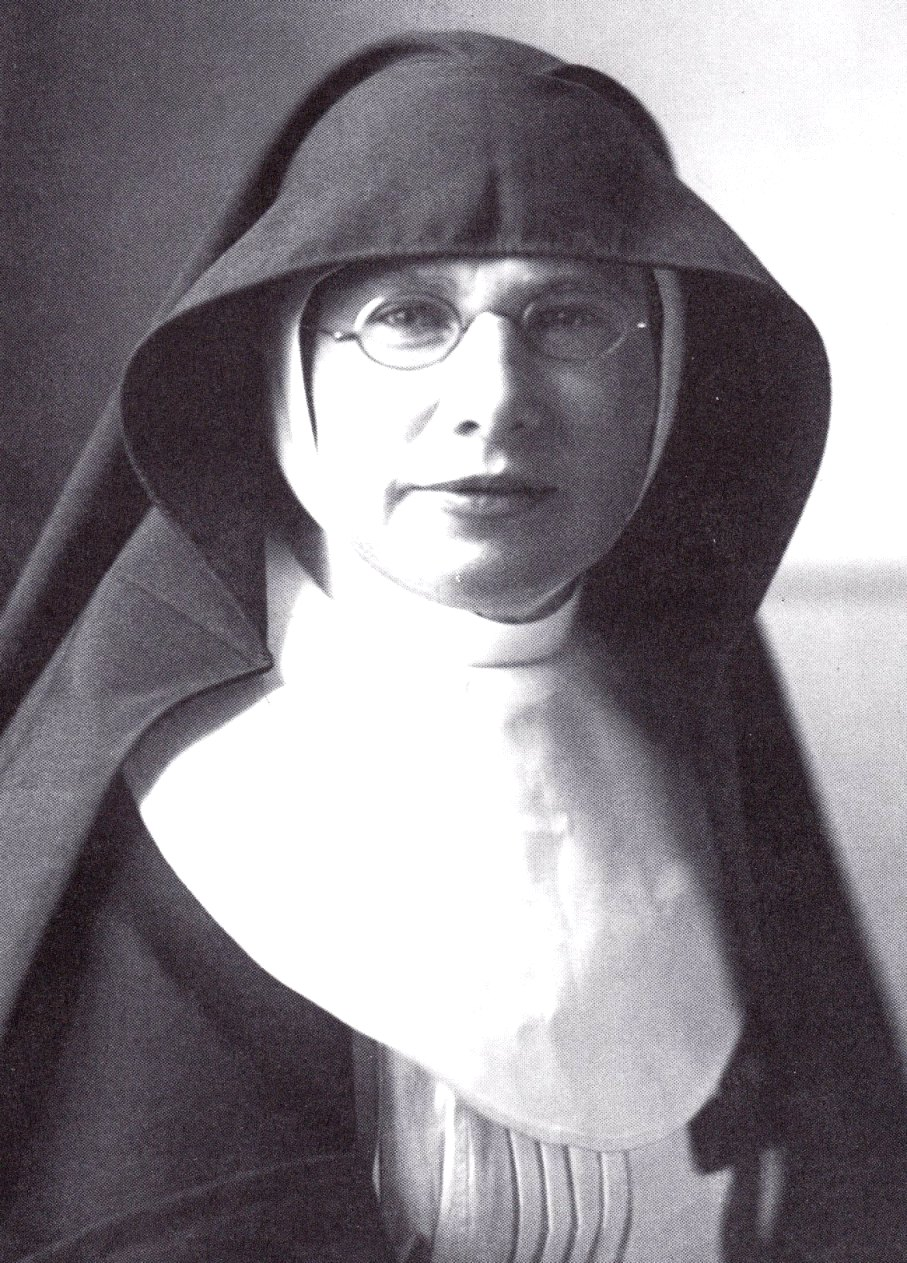
- Born: Henriette Haeck; 30 September 1883; Turnhout, Belgium
- Died: 30 June 1961 (aged 77); Maarssen, Netherlands
- Education: Heilig Graf Instituut

Sister Maria-Jozefa (born Henriette Haeck; 30 September 1883 – 30 June 1961) was a Belgian nun, educator, and poet. She directed the Heilig Graf Instituut ('Holy Sepulchre Institute') in Turnhout and is credited with "Dutchifying" the institution.

== Biography ==
Sister Maria-Jozefa was born Henriette Haeck on 30 September 1883 in Turnhout, Belgium. She was the eldest daughter of Pieter Haeck and Helena Haeck (née Lambrechts). Her younger brother Herman Haeck (1888–1960) became a Jesuit priest and author.

Maria-Jozefa was educated at the Heilig Graf Instituut (Holy Sepulchre Institute) in Turnhout from 1901, taking her perpetual vows as a Roman Catholic nun on 25 August 1905. From 1906, she directed the institute.

As director, Maria-Jozefa "Dutchified" the school, translating the Flemish language textbooks into Dutch. She was supported by lay figures such as lawyer and politician Frans Van Cauwelaert. She also translated hymns and psalms into Dutch. She added a teacher training college and contributed articles on pedagogy to the Flemish Educational Journal.

In 1927, Sister Maria-Jozefa was appointed prioress of the newly founded priory near Nijmegen, Gelderland, Netherlands and left Flanders. She served here until retiring from education in 1957.

Sister Maria-Jozefa also wrote religious poetry and contributed works to the Flemish literary magazine Dietsche Warande (DW B) and Belfort.

Sister Maria-Jozefa died on 30 June 1961 in Maarssen, Utrecht, Netherlands.

In 2021, Sister Maria-Jozefa was included in a heritage walk in Turnhout.
