= Imperial-Royal Army =

Imperial-Royal Army (German Kaiserlich-königliche Armee) may refer to:

- Imperial and Royal Army during the Napoleonic Wars (1745–1806)
- Imperial Austrian Army (1806–1867)

== See also ==
- Imperial Austrian Army (disambiguation)
