= Cartamundi =

Belgian game publisher and package manufacturer

Cartamundi Group
- Type: Private
- Industry: Casino, Collectibles, Games, Trading Cards, Packaging and Retail
- Founded: Turnhout, Belgium (1765; 261 years ago)
- Headquarters: Turnhout, Belgium
- Number of locations: 12 plants (2024)
- Key people: Stefaan Merckx (CEO), Istvan Lagaert (CFO)
- Products: Board Games, Card Games, Collectible Card Games, Packages and Playing Cards
- Revenue: €648 million (2022)
- Number of employees: 2,972 (2022)
- Website: cartamundi.com

Cartamundi Group is a company based in Turnhout, Belgium, that manufactures, produces, and sells board games, card games, collectible card games, packages, and playing cards through its manufacturing and sales subsidiaries. The name of the company in Latin means cards for the world. It is one of the world's largest playing card manufacturers.

The company also maintains manufacturing facilities in Canvey Island (UK), Altenburg (Germany), Kraków (Poland), Mumbai (India), Sōka (Japan), and Dallas (Texas, United States). In 2015, the company acquired Hasbro's board game factories in Waterford, Ireland, and East Longmeadow, Massachusetts. However in August 2023, the former Hasbro facility in Ireland was closed, losing 235 jobs.

In the early-to-mid 1990s, Cartamundi produced collectible card games for other companies. Their Belgian factory printed early editions of Magic: The Gathering for Wizards of the Coast, and Decipher, Inc.'s Star Trek Customizable Card Game and Star Wars Customizable Card Game, and currently prints non-English language editions of Magic. English Magic sets are printed in Dallas.

== History ==
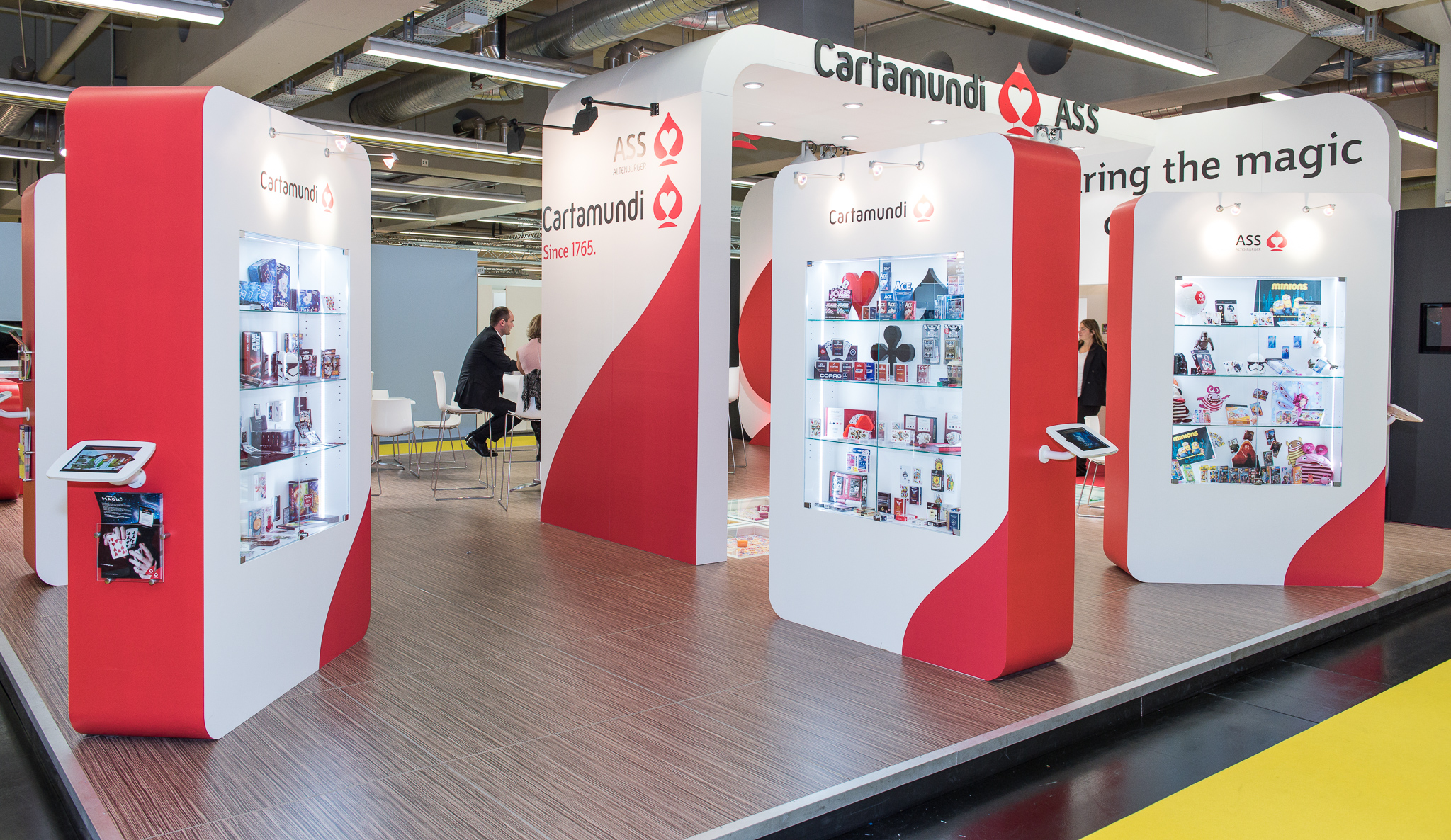
Cartamundi's booth at the 2016 Nuremberg International Toy Fair.

The company was founded in 1970 as a joint venture among Biermans, Brepols, and Van Genechten.The history of these three companies dates back to 1765.

Cartamundi has established over a dozen international sales branches throughout the world since 1970; France in 1993, U.S. in 1994, the Netherlands and Sweden in 1999, Hungary in 2000, Singapore and Spain in 2002, Austria in 2005, Italy in 2010, and Turkey in 2011. The other branches were established through acquiring other companies. Cartamundi acquired AGMüller (Switzerland) in 1999, Altenburger und Stralsunder Spielkarten (Germany) in 2000, Spielkartenfabrik Altenburg (Germany) in 2002, Games & Print Services, Ltd (U.K.) in 2003, Dertor (Poland) and Copag (Brazil) in 2005, Yaquinto Printing Company (U.S.) in 2007, 50% of Parksons Games & Sports (India) in 2010, Marigó (Spain) in 2011, France Cartes in 2014, Naipes Heraclio Fournier (Spain) and the United States Playing Card Company in 2019.
