= Philippus Jacobus Brepols =

Belgian publisher and entrepreneur (1778–1845)

- Born: 1778
- Died: 3 January 1845 (aged 66–67)
- Occupations: Printer; publisher; entrepreneur
- Years active: 1795–1845
- Known for: Founder of Brepols
- Children: 1

Philippus Jacobus Brepols (1778 – 3 January 1845) was a Belgian publisher and founder of the Brepols printing family-business in Turnhout, Belgium.

== Early life ==
Brepols was born in 1778.

== Career ==
In 1795, Pieter Corbeels, a printer from Leuven moved together with Philippus Jacobus Brepols as his assistant and apprentice, to Turnhout, possibly to flee the French military which occupied the Austrian Netherlands at that time.

Since Corbeels was executed for his fight against the French, Brepols had to take over the responsibility for the printing company.

The widow of Corbeels managed the business for short while, but from 1800 onwards P.J. Brepols gradually took over the house and the business.

Brepols published popular prints such as catchpenny prints and devotionalia. The prints were originally in black and white but many of them were hand-colored by later owners

== Personal life and death ==
On 3 January 1845 P.J. Brepols died and the company was continued by his only daughter Antoinette Brepols, who in 1820 had married Jan Jozef Dierckx, a merchant.

== Gallery ==
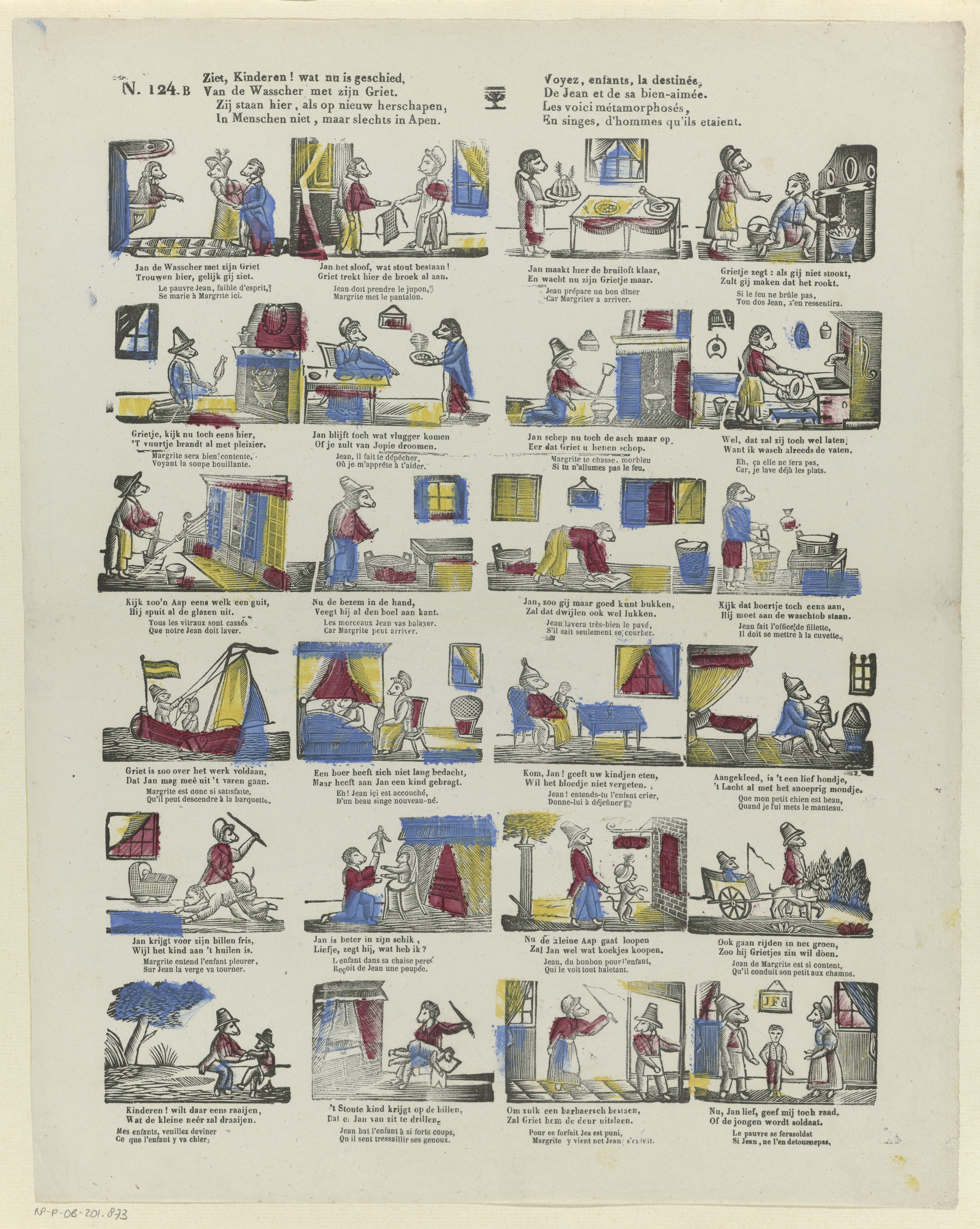
Illustrated poetry for children

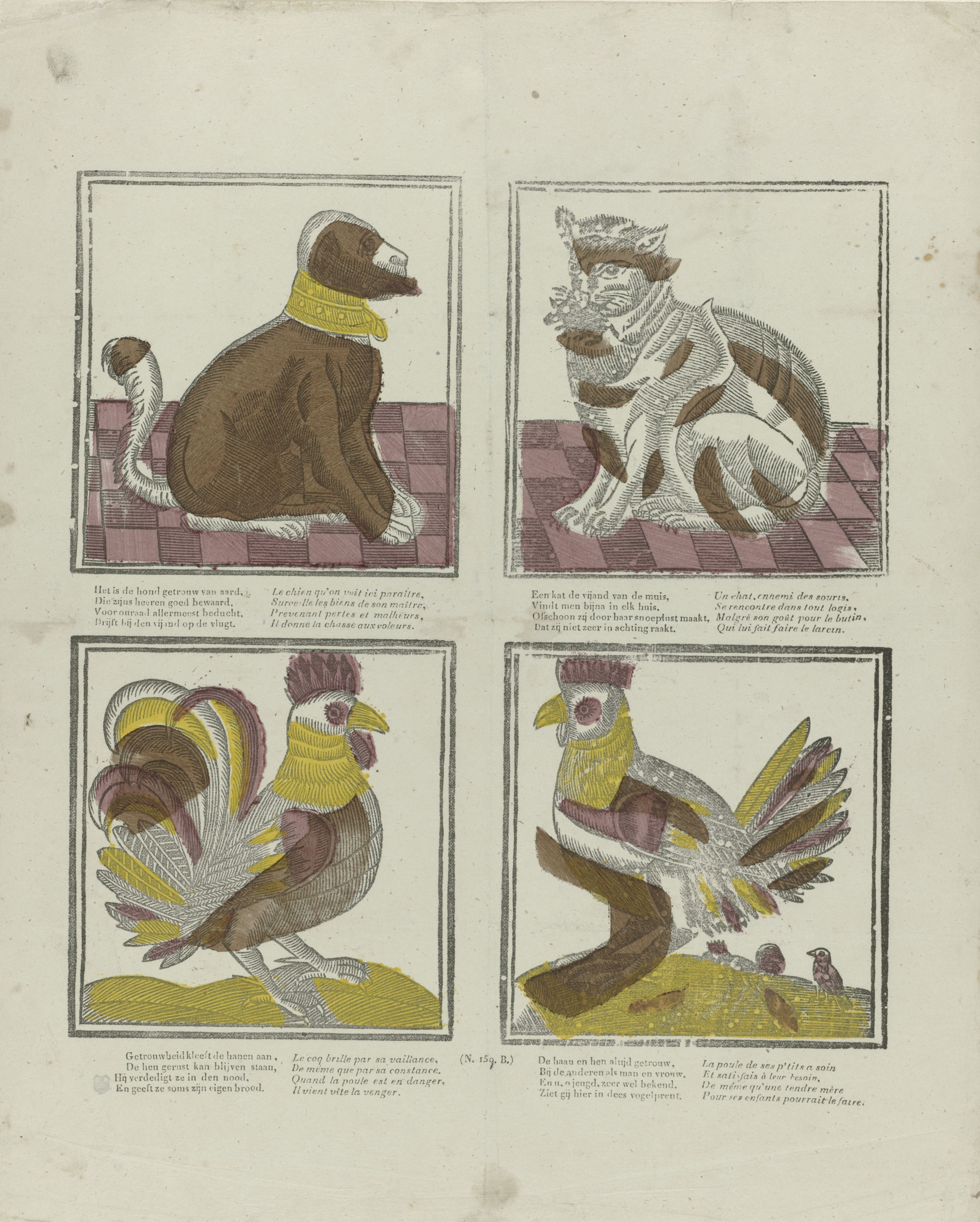
Animals with poems in Dutch and French

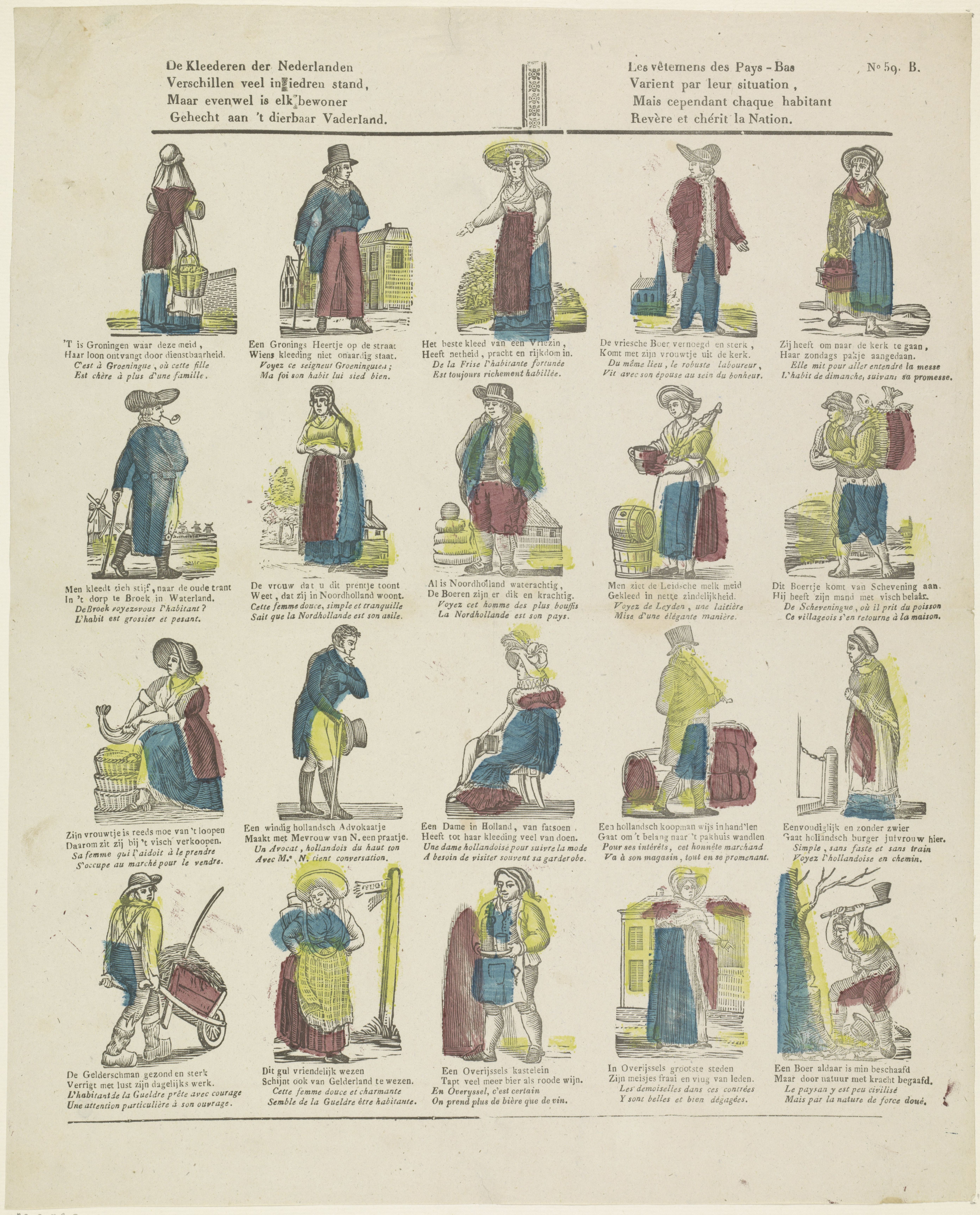
Print about fashion

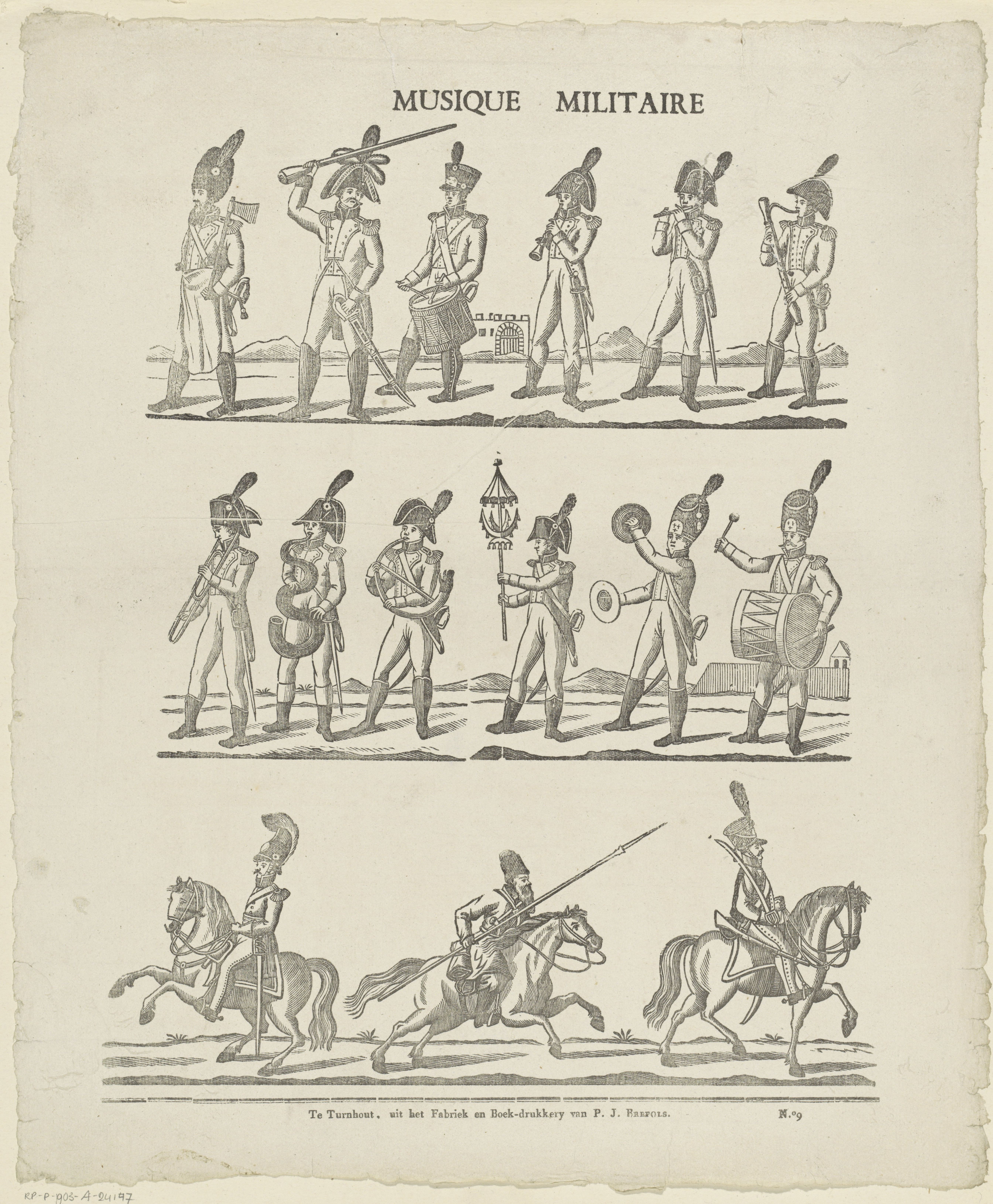
Soldiers; military music

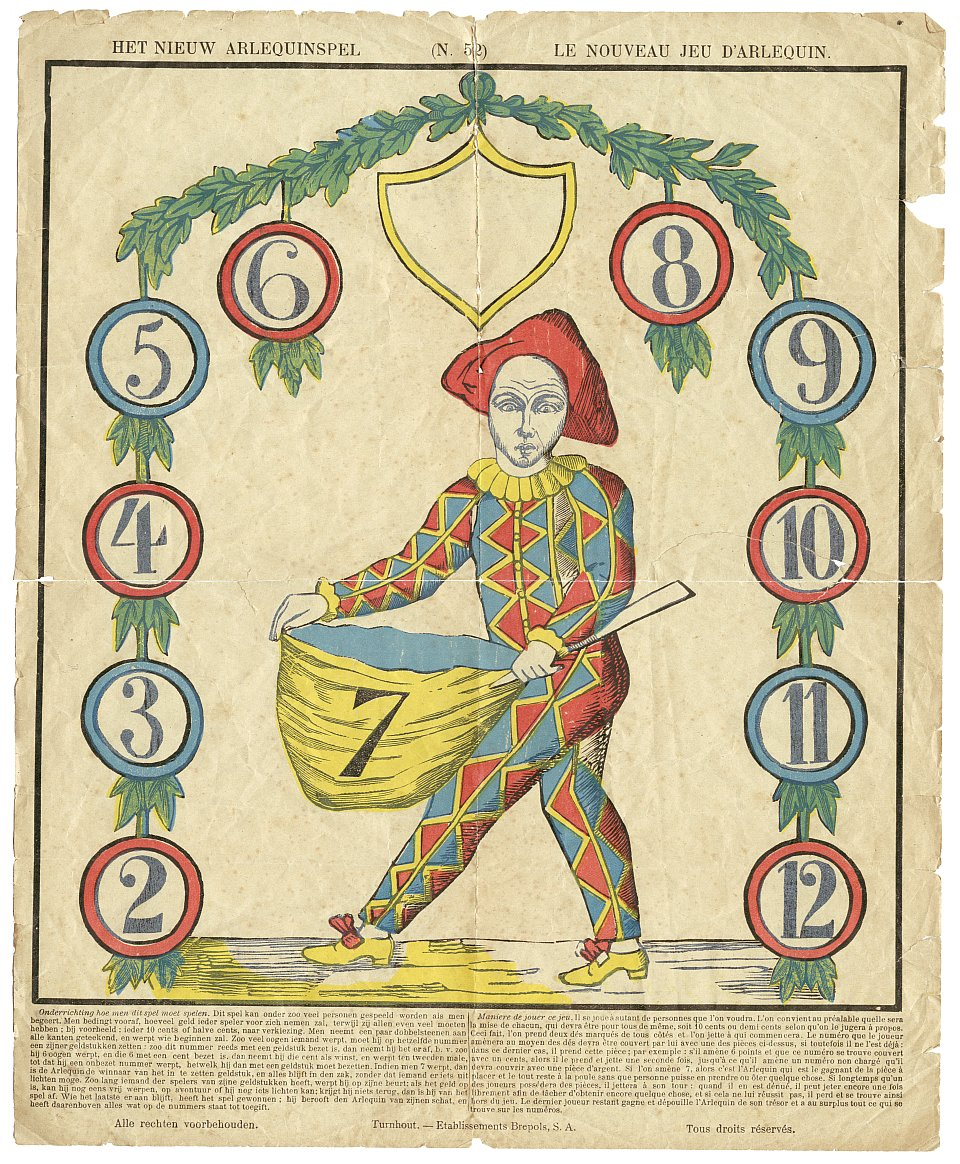
One of his printed pages from 1827

== Sources ==
- Roland Baetens (Ed.), Harry de Kok, Pierre Delsaerdt, Gerrit de Vijlder and Ludo Simons, Brepols drukkers en uitgevers 1796-1996, Brepols, 1996.
