= Jean-André van der Mersch =

Belgian military officer (1734–1792)

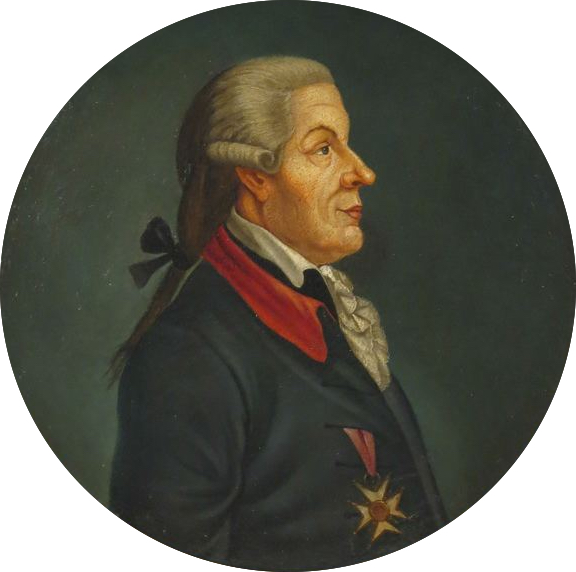
- Born: Menen, Flanders, Austrian Netherlands
- Baptised: 10 January 1734
- Died: 14 September 1792; Dadizele
- Occupation: Army officer
- Political party: Vonckist

Jean-André van der Mersch (also known as Jan Andries vander Mersch or Jan André van der Meersch) (Menen, 10 January 1734 – Dadizele, 14 September 1792) was a leading figure in the Brabant Revolution best known for his victory against Austrian forces of Joseph II at the Battle of Turnhout in 1789.

He served the French King as an officer during the Seven Years' War and participated in the Battle of Rossbach (1757) and the Battle of Hochkirch (1758). He joined the Austrian army in 1778 before retiring with the rank of colonel.

In 1789 he accepted the invitation of Jan Frans Vonck to become the commander of the patriot army which fought in the Brabant Revolution.
