= Austrian army =

Austrian army may refer to:

- Austrian Federal Army, the modern Austrian military
- Austro-Hungarian Army, the ground force of the Austro-Hungarian Dual Monarchy from 1867 to 1918
  - Common Army, the largest part of the Austro-Hungarian Army from 1867 to 1914
  - Imperial-Royal Landwehr (of Austria), 1867 to 1918
- Imperial Army of the Holy Roman Emperor, the army of the Habsburg emperors
- Austrian Army during the French Revolutionary and Napoleonic Wars, the Austrian army from 1792 to 1815
- Imperial Austrian Army (1806–1867), army of the Austrian Empire
- Imperial Austrian Army (disambiguation)
