= Peasants' War (1798) =

Part of the French Revolutionary Wars

- Part of the French Revolutionary Wars (Note: In between the War of the First Coalition and the War of the Second Coalition)
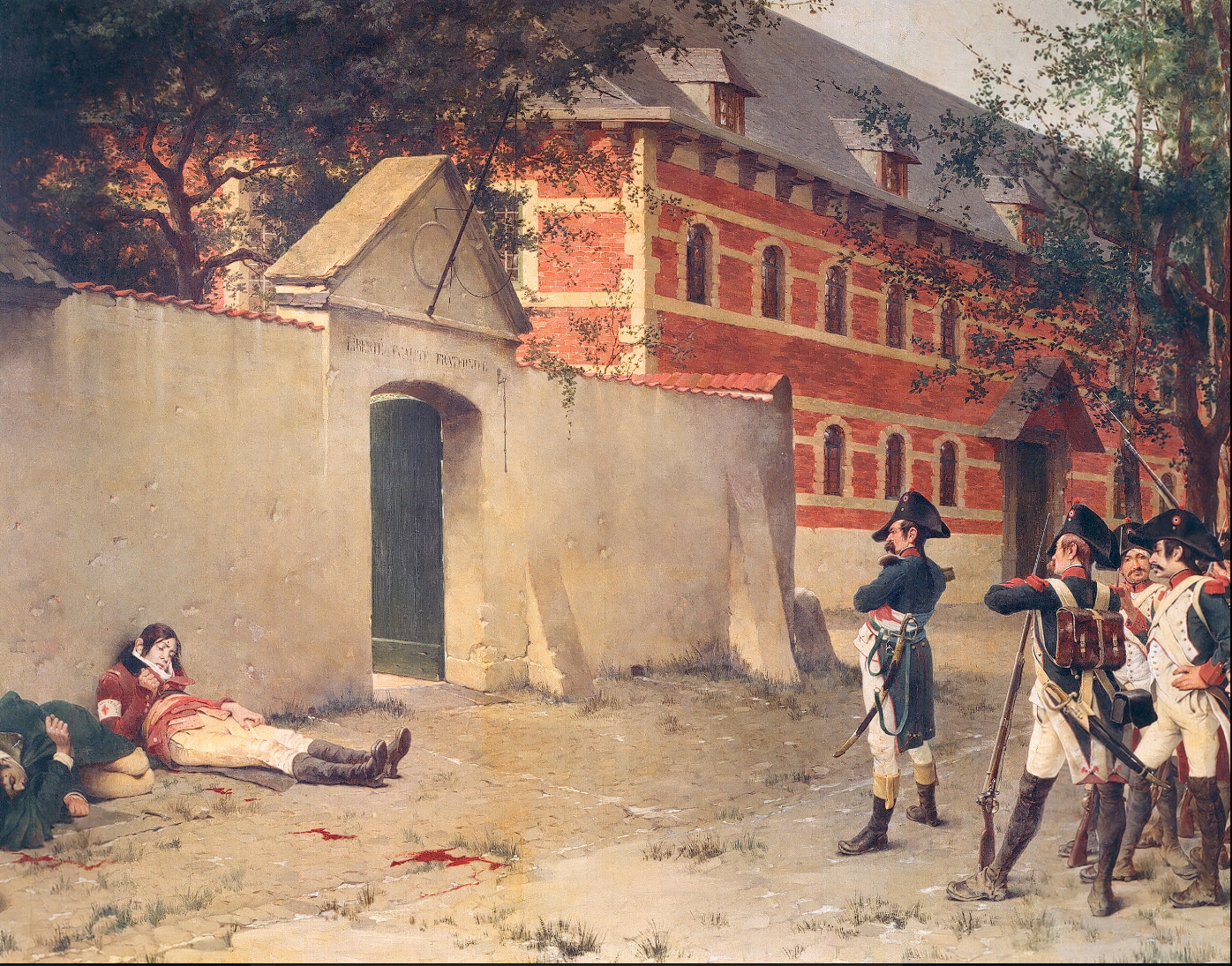
- Episode from the Peasants' War; Théophile Lybaert, 1885
Date	12 October – 5 December 1798 (1 month and 23 days)
Location	Southern Netherlands annexed by the French Republic (Note: Modern-day Belgium, Luxembourg, and German border lands)
Result	French Republican victory

Belligerents
(France) French Republic	Insurgents

Commanders and leaders
(France) Claude-Sylvestre Colaud	Pieter Corbeels (executed); Emmanuel Rollier Charles de Loupoigne †

Casualties and losses
	In Flanders, c.15,000 dead In Luxembourg, 200–300

The Peasants' War (French: Guerre des Paysans; Dutch: Boerenkrijg; German: Klöppelkrieg; Luxembourgish: Klëppelkrich) was a peasant revolt in 1798 against the French Republican occupiers of the Southern Netherlands, a region which now includes Belgium, Luxembourg, and parts of Germany. The French had annexed the region in 1795 and control of the region was officially ceded to the French after the Treaty of Campo Formio in 1797. The revolt is considered part of the French Revolutionary Wars.

== Motivations for war ==
After the Southern Netherlands was annexed by France, the French revolutionaries began to implement their policies regarding the Catholic Church. The Civil Constitution of the Clergy required that priests take an oath of allegiance to the state. Priests who refused such an oath (non-juring priests) were considered to be enemies of the state and could be removed from their positions and homes. Additionally, in early 1798, the French Council of Five Hundred passed a law requiring compulsory military service. This law ordered the conscription of men between the ages of 20 and 25 in all French territories. General conscription was an innovation and was met with anger by the men who were forced into service.

== By region ==
=== Flanders ===
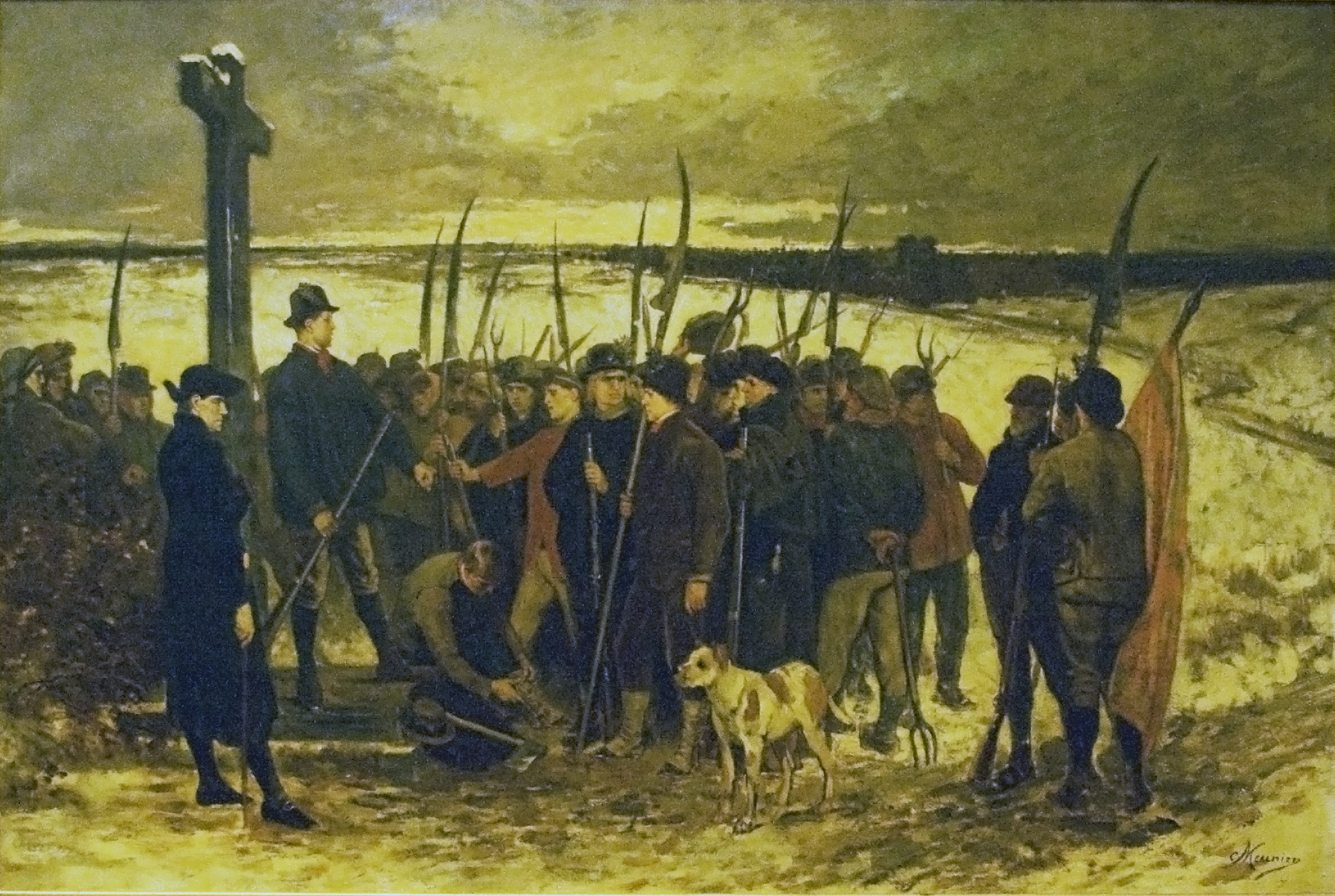
Peasants gathering (Constantin Meunier, 1875)

The majority of the conflict during the Peasants' War occurred in Flanders (Lys and Scheldt départements) and Brabant (Deux-Nèthes and Dyle départements). Referred to as the Boerenkrijg, it is referenced by some historians as a Belgian national revolt, and an indication of a desire for independence by Belgium. In Flanders the revolt was somewhat organized, with the people seeking aid from foreign nations such as Great Britain and Prussia. The revolution began on 12 October 1798, with peasants taking up arms against the French in Overmere. Initially the rebellion was somewhat successful. However, it was crushed less than two months later, on 5 December in Hasselt, because the peasants lacked proper arms and training. An estimated 5,000–10,000 people were killed during the uprising. Additionally, 170 leaders of the rebellion were executed.

=== Luxembourg ===
In Luxembourg (Forêts département), the revolt was called Klëppelkrich. This revolt quickly spread, consuming most of West Eifel. The primary combatants in Luxembourg were the peasantry. The middle and upper classes were not driven to revolt, as the anti-clericalism and the modernisation brought by the French Revolution were somewhat beneficial to them.

Lacking both financial support from the middle classes, and proper military training, the peasants were quickly put down by the French occupation force. Ninety-four insurgents were tried; of these, 42 were executed.

== In later culture ==
- Episodes of the war were depicted by the 19th century Belgian artist and sculptor Constantin Meunier.

== See also ==
- Brabant Revolution
- Siege of Malta, which began as a peasant uprising against French rule in 1798

== Explanatory notes ==
Preceded by Quasi-War	French Revolution: Revolutionary campaigns Peasants' War (1798)	Succeeded by War of the Second Coalition
