= Turnhout =

- Municipality
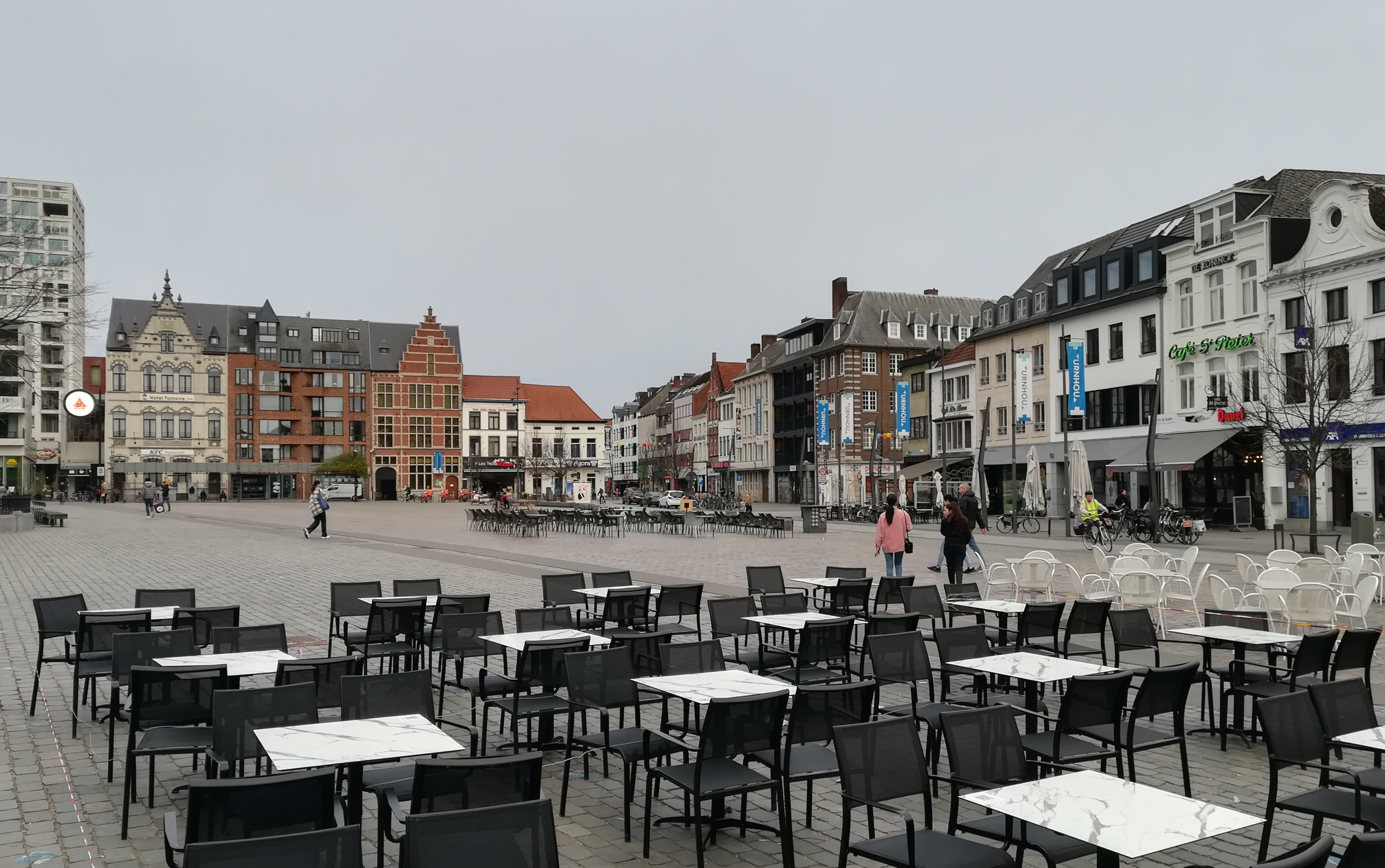
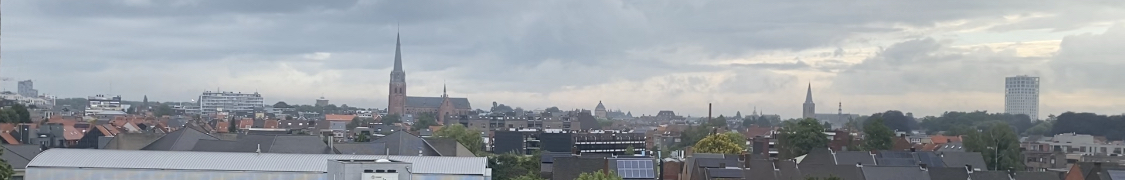
- Grote Markt Skyline of Turnhout

- Flag Coat of arms

- Location of Turnhout in the province of Antwerp
- Interactive map of Turnhout
- Location in Belgium
- Coordinates: 51°19′N 04°57′E
- Country: Belgium
- Community: Flemish Community
- Region: Flemish Region
- Province: Antwerp
- Arrondissement: Turnhout

Government
  - Mayor: Hannes Anaf (Vooruit)
  - Governing parties: Vooruit, N-VA, CD&V

Area
  - Total: 56.71 km^{2} (21.90 sq mi)

Population (2018-01-01)
  - Total: 44,136
  - Density: 778.3/km^{2} (2,016/sq mi)
- Postal codes: 2300
- NIS code: 13040
- Area codes: 014
- Website: www.turnhout.be

Turnhout (Dutch pronunciation: [ˈtʏr(ə)nɦʌut]) is a Belgian municipality and city located in the Flemish province of Antwerp. The municipality comprises only the city of Turnhout proper. In 2021, its population was 45,874. The total area is 56.06 km^{2} (21.64 sq mi). The agglomeration is much more populous, with 81,473 inhabitants. It is known for its playing card industry, and houses the head office of the world's largest manufacturer of playing cards, Cartamundi. Turnhout is also the capital of the administrative district with the same name. The city council often promotes the city as "the capital of the Campine area".

Turnhout serves as the economic and cultural center for other communities in the immediate vicinity with more than 40 schools. There is also an important services sector with two hospitals, a two-stage theatre, and an eight-screen cinema.

Turnhout is located 42 km (26 mi) from the centre of Antwerp, 30 km (19 mi) from Breda and Tilburg, 40 km (25 mi) from Eindhoven. The football club of the city is K.V. Turnhout.

== History ==
Turnhout originated on the crossroads of two major trade routes and in the protection of the hunting castle of the Dukes of Brabant that seems to have existed since 1110 or earlier. This hunting past is still reflected in the city's coat of arms. The small community that developed obtained its Libertas as a "free city" from Henry I, Duke of Brabant in about 1212. In 1338, the privilege of organizing a market on Saturday was granted, a tradition that still holds today, the city could now hold an annual fair so that all the goods from the surrounding villages could be offered for sale in Turnhout. In 1466, a traveler described the well-built houses and paved roads, and counted five churches.

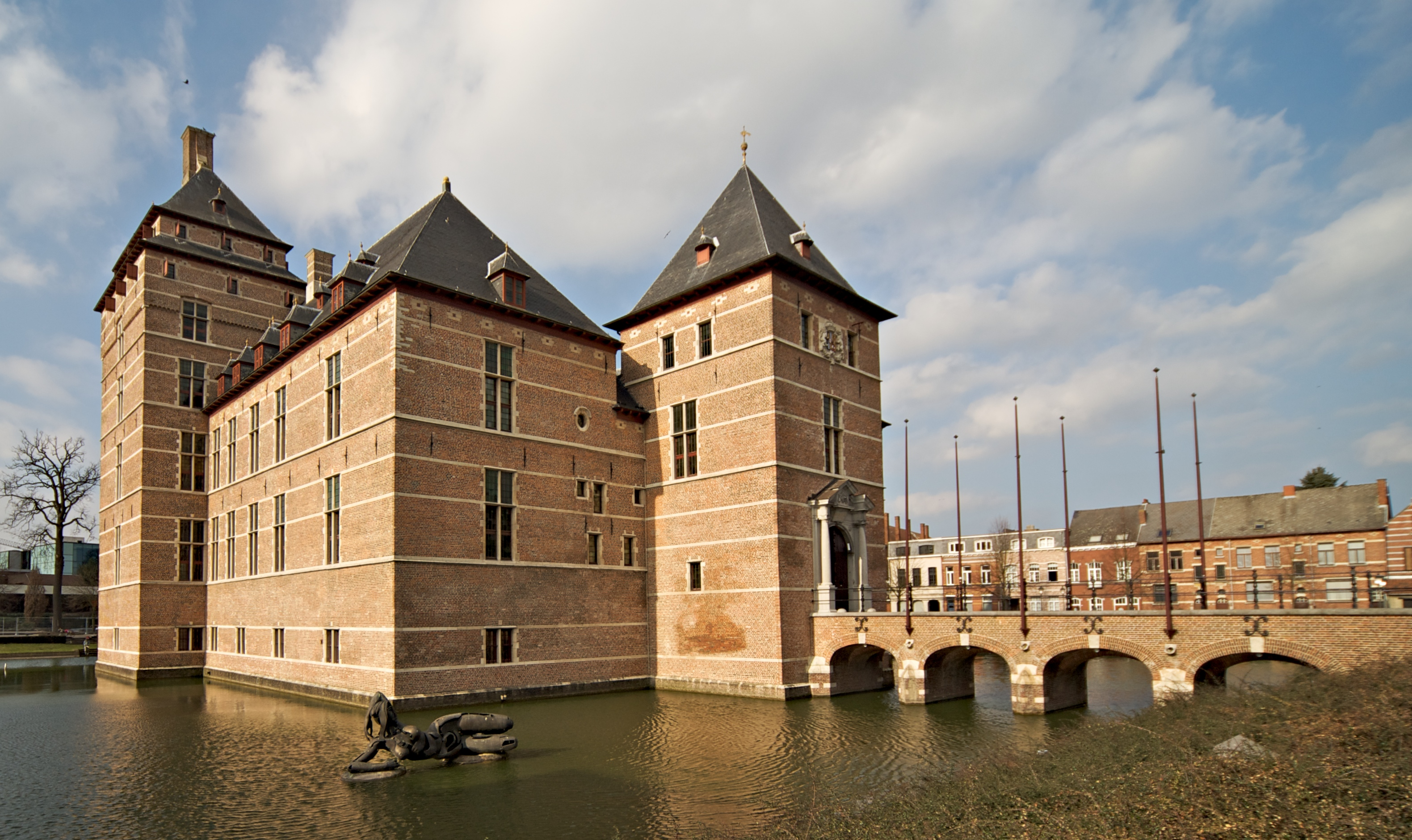
Castle of the Dukes of Brabant in Turnhout

By the 16th century, Turnhout had become a wealthy commercial center. Unfortunately, the end of the century brought war, fire, confiscations and epidemics. Suppression and inquisition made many progressive citizens to take refuge in the Dutch Republic, leaving the land of Turnhout impoverished. The further history of Turnhout consists of a series of ups and downs. Many times, the city and surroundings were the playground of armies, resulting in two major battles named after Turnhout: one in 1597 and one in 1789 are referred to as Battle of Turnhout.

In 1830, Belgium became independent, and Turnhout fell just south of the new border with the Netherlands. The period of peace between 1831 and 1914 saw the digging of the canal (1846) and the construction of the railroad (1855).

In the late Middle Ages, Turnhout was a well-known center for the weaving of bedding articles and of the linen trade. At the start of the 19th century, these trades were replaced by industries based on the use of paper. Pieter Corbeels and Philippus Jacobus Brepols are considered to be the founders of this industry. Turnhout retains much of this industry today. Numerous graphics companies are located in the region, such as Brepols, Group Joos, Proost International Book Production, Van Genechten Packaging, and last but not least Cartamundi, the world market leader of the playing card industry. In addition, the Belgian Centre for the Graphics Industry, and the Flemish Innovation Center for Graphic Communication (Campus Blairon) are located in Turnhout. Soudal, whose headquarters is located in Turnhout, is one of the leading companies in sealants.

=== Postal history ===
The Turnhout post office opened before 1830. It used postal code 122 with bars (before 1864), and 367 with points before 1874.

Postal code since 1969: 2300.

== Sights ==
Architectural sights worth visiting are the 12th century castle of the Dukes of Brabant, the Gothic church of St. Peter, the beguinage (begijnhof) dating from the 13th century, the 14th century Gothic chapel of Theobald and the Taxandria museum housed in a prestigious Renaissance mansion. Of particular interest is the Museum of the Playing Card. This is located in an old factory building downtown and houses a beautifully restored steam engine.

The beguinage was recognized by UNESCO as a World Heritage Site in 1998.

The largest building in Turnhout is the Turnova tower, built in 2019. It is considered the first skyscraper in the city.

== Sports ==
- KFC Turnhout, a football club
- White Caps Turnhout, an ice hockey club
- RC Turnhout, a rugby club

== Gallery ==
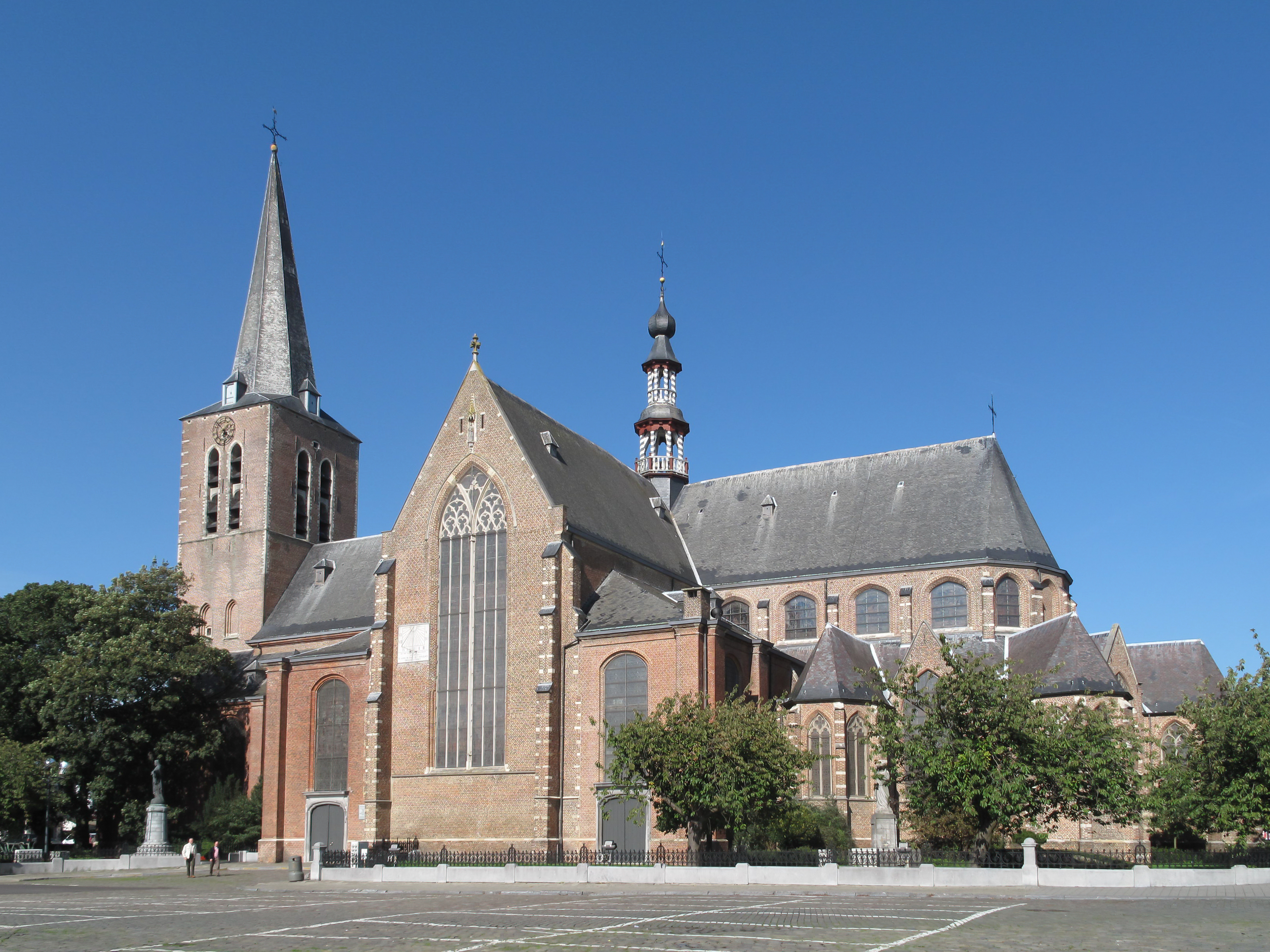
Turnhout, church: Sint Pieterskerk

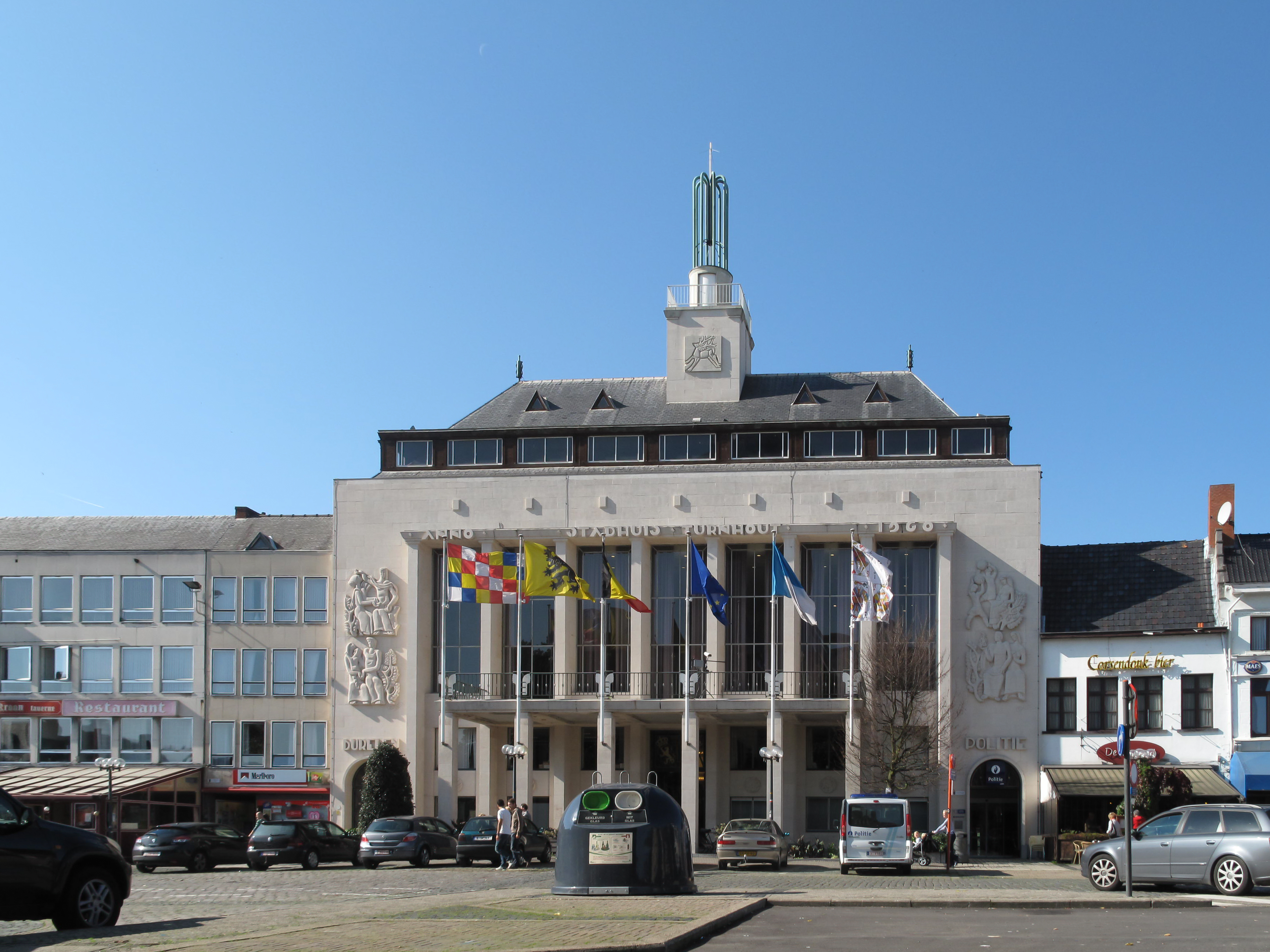
Turnhout, town hall

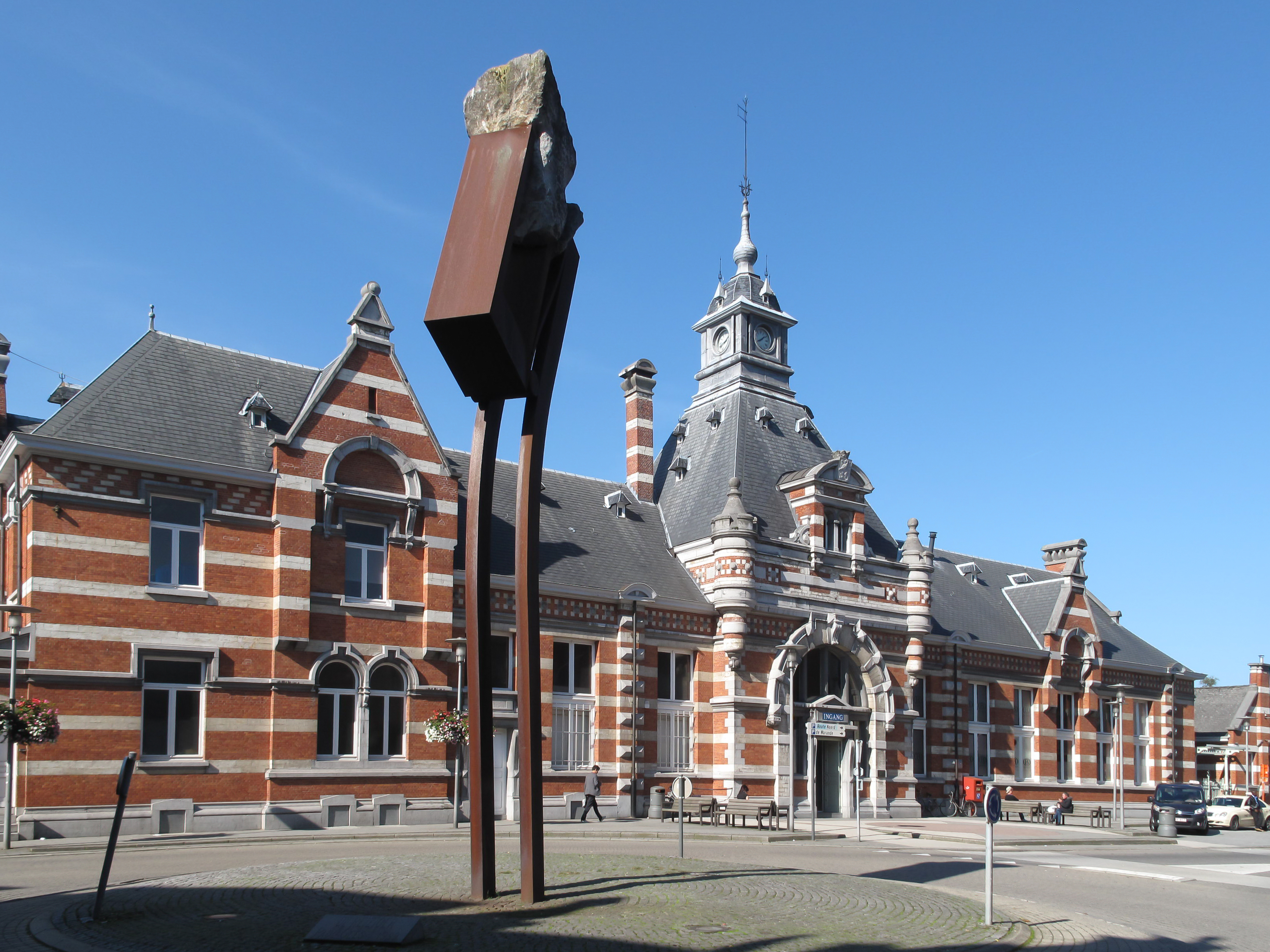
Turnhout, train station

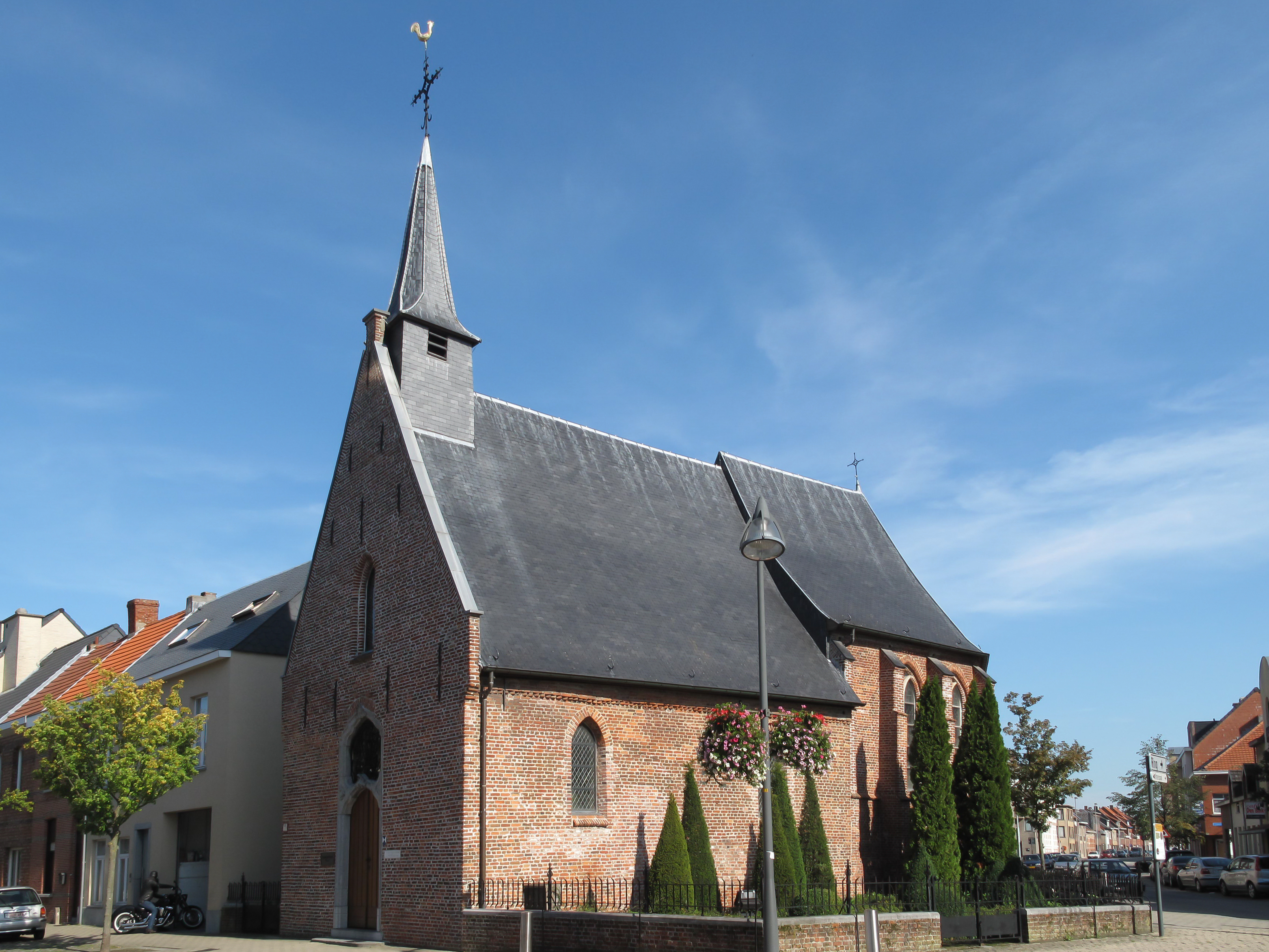
Turnhout, chapel

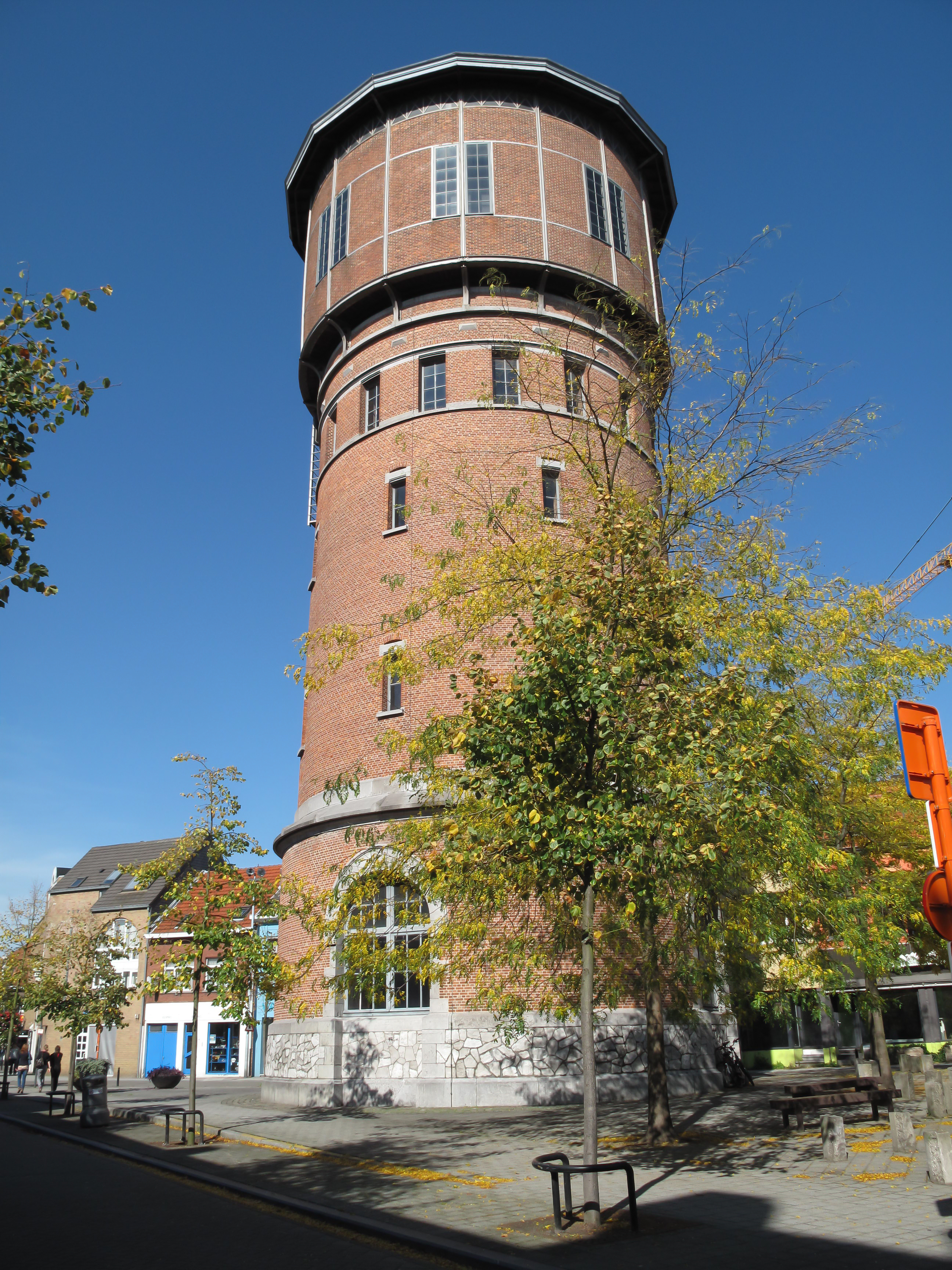
Turnhout, water tower

== Notable residents ==
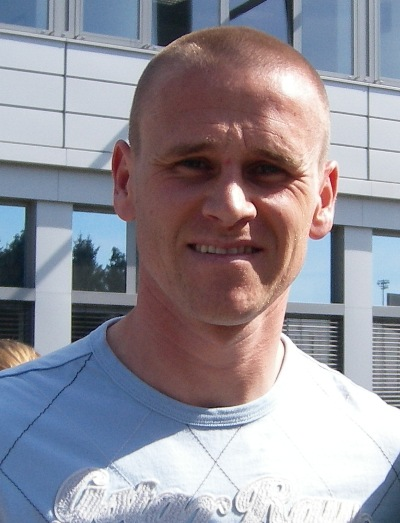
Filip Daems

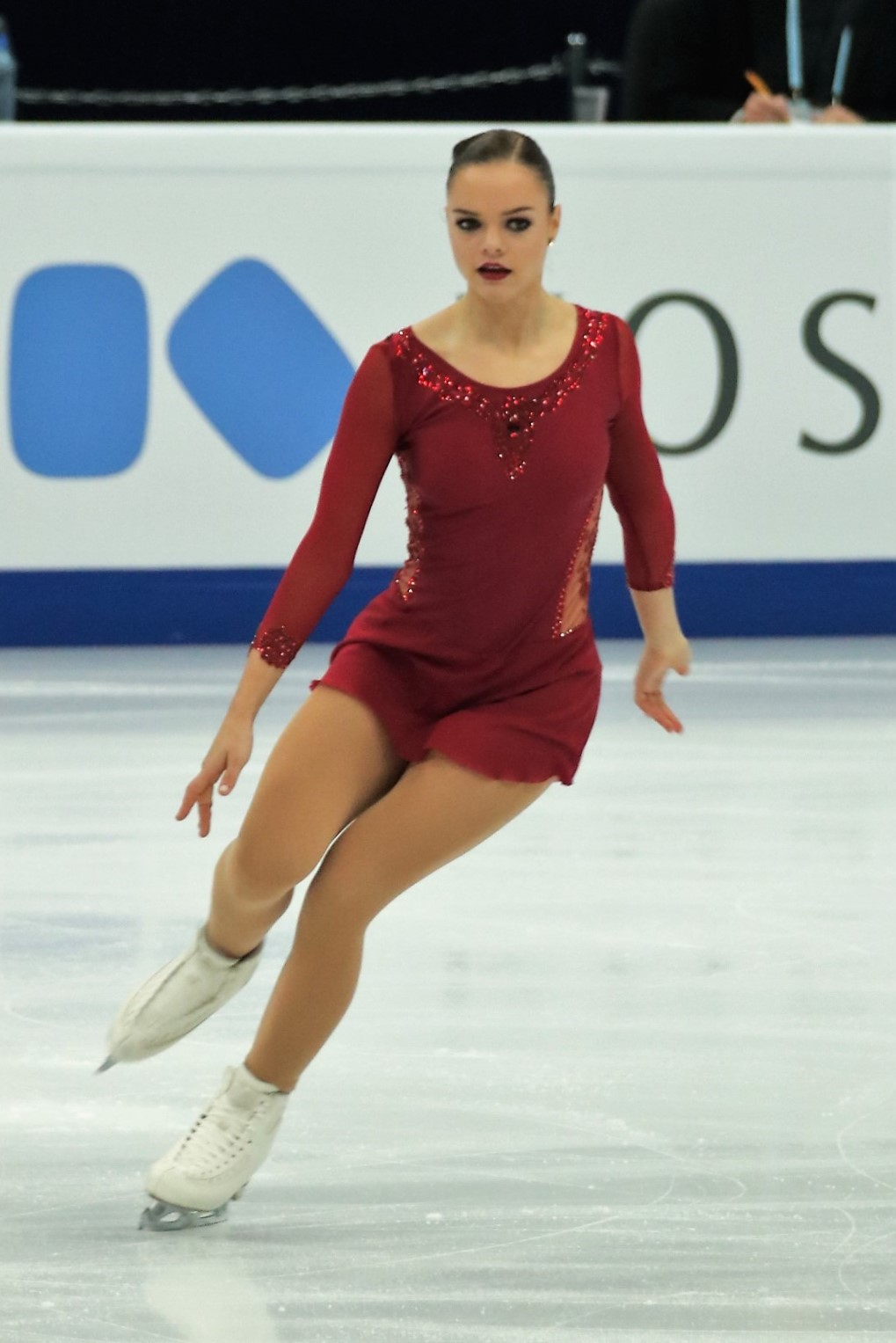
Loena Hendrickx

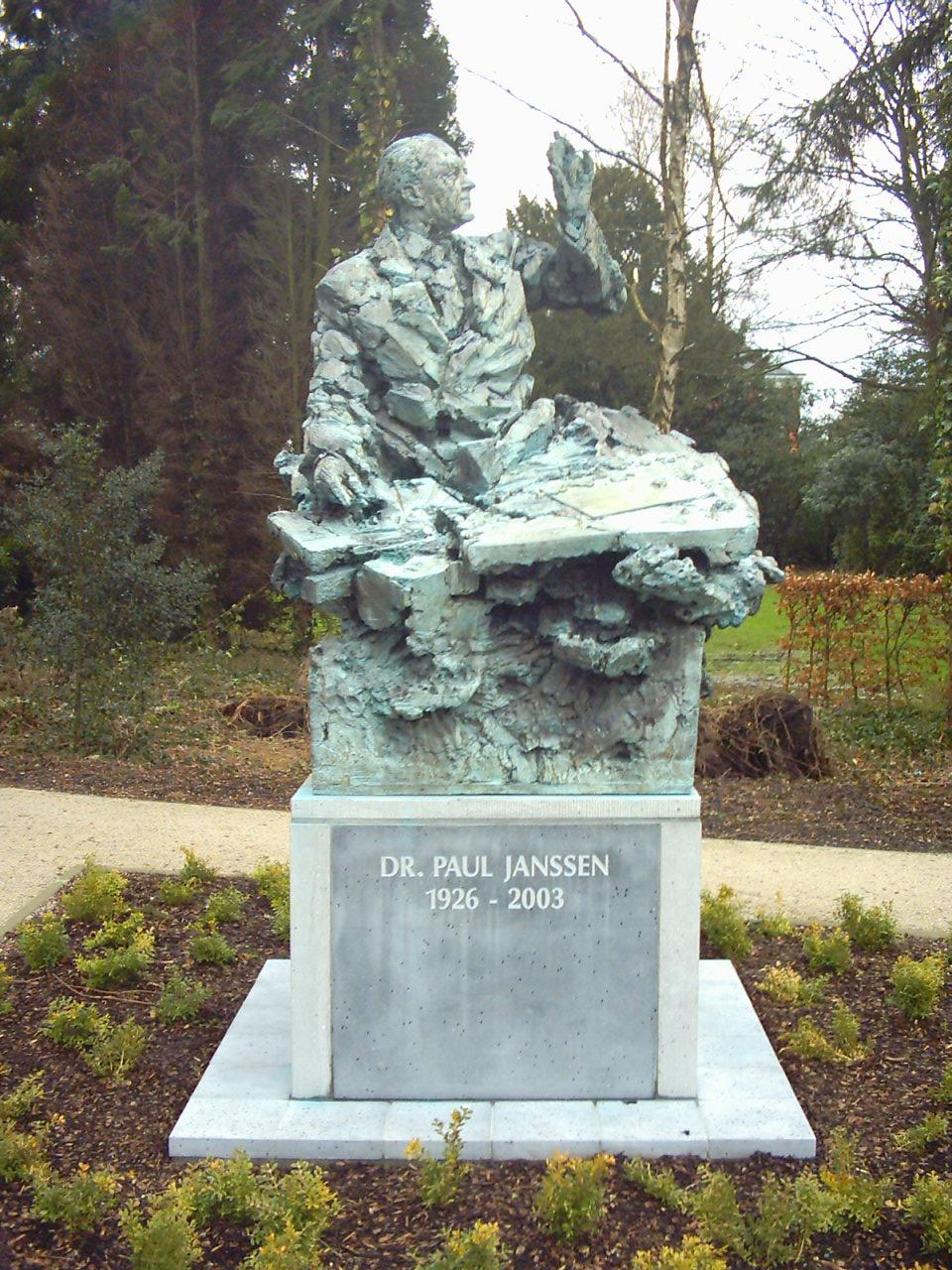
Paul Janssen

- Marc de Bonte, kickboxer (born 1990)
- Shanne Braspennincx, track cyclist, Olympic gold medalist (born 1991)
- Philippus Jacobus Brepols, founder of Brepols (1778–1845)
- Sven Breugelmans, motocross world champion (born 1979)
- Pieter Corbeels, printer and a leader of the Boerenkrijg (1755–1799)
- Filip Daems, footballer (born 1978)
- Koen De Bouw, actor (born 1964)
- Bart Dockx, professional cyclist for UCI ProTeam Predictor-Lotto (born 1981)
- Didier de Chaffoy de Courcelles, scientist and businessman (born 1952)
- François du Four, printer and mayor (1871–1945)
- Paul Geerts, comics artist, successor of Willy Vandersteen as artist and author for the Spike and Suzy comics (born 1937)
- Gaspar Gevartius, jurisconsult of Antwerp and philologist (1593–1666)
- Joris Hendrickx, 2009 Sidecarcross world champion (born 1983)
- Loena Hendrickx, figure skater (born 1999)
- Marcel Hendrickx, politician and former Mayor (1935–2020)
- Constant Janssen, father of Paul Janssen and founder of the N.V. Producten Richter (1895–1970)
- Paul Janssen, pharmacologist, founder of Janssen Pharmaceutica (1926–2003)
- Flor Joosen, businessman, well known for his caviar business (born 1952)
- Micha Marah, singer, Eurovision representative in 1979 (born 1953)
- Aloïs Michielsen, chairman of the board and former CEO of Solvay (born 1942)
- Cornelis Oomius, Calvinist preacher (c. 1576–1653), father of Calvinist theologian Simon Oomius (1630–1706)
- Greet Minnen, tennis player (born 1997)
- Hendrik Peeters, sculptor (1815–1869)
- Jozef Simons, writer (1888–1948)
- Lieve Slegers, long-distance runner (born 1965)
- Jan Renier Snieders, physician and writer (1812–1888)
- Paul Stoffels, co-founder of Tibotec and Virco (born 1962)
- Chika Unigwe, writer (born 1974)
- Hans Van Alphen, decathlete, 4th place in the London 2012 Olympics (born 1982)
- Maijcken Van Bracht, wife of Jan van de Velde the Elder and mother of Jan van de Velde (1620–1662)
- Albert Van Dyck, painter (1902–1951)
- Geert van Turnhout, composer (c. 1520–1580)
- Jan van Turnhout, composer (c. 1545–1618)
- Cornelis Verdonck, composer of the late Renaissance (1563–1625)
- Frans Vermeyen, footballer (born 1943)
- Zuster Maria-Jozefa, nun, educator and poet (1883–1961)

== Twin towns – sister cities ==
Turnhout is twinned with:

- Hammelburg, Germany
- Hanzhong, China
- Gödöllő, Hungary
- Vânători (Mișca), Romania
