= Battle of Turnhout (1789) =

Battle during Brabant Revolution

Coordinates: 51°19′0″N 4°57′0″E

- Part of the Brabant Revolution
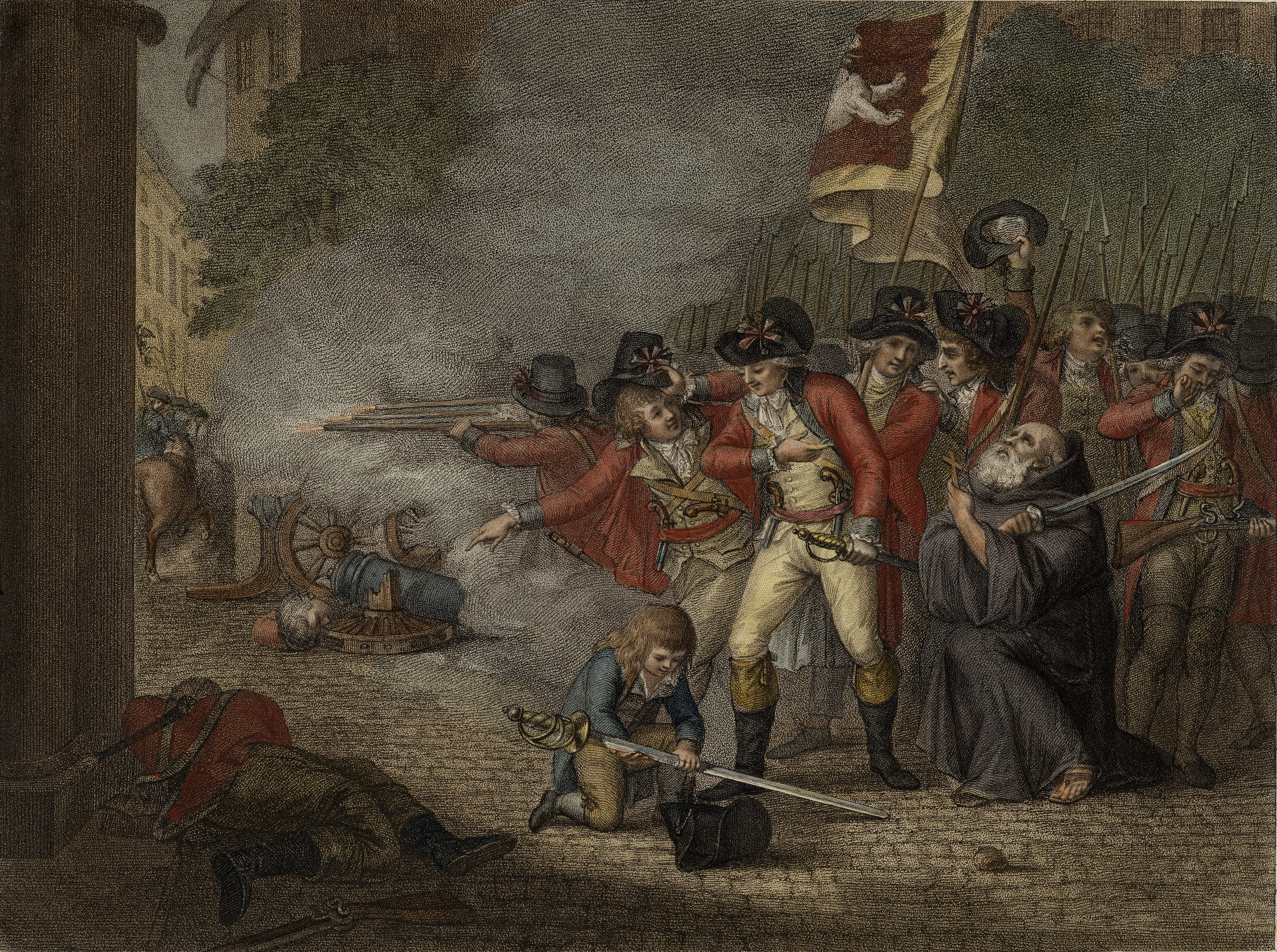
- 1790 engraving of the battle
Date	27 October 1789
Location	Turnhout, Austrian Netherlands
Result	Belgian victory: Austrian withdrawal from Belgium; Creation of the United Belgian States

Belligerents
Belgian rebels	Austria

Commanders and leaders
Jean-André van der Mersch	Richard D'Alton; Gottfried von Schröder

Strength
2,000	2,500

Casualties and losses
87 killed or wounded	108 killed 60 wounded 23 missing 3 cannons lost

The Battle of Turnhout (27 October 1789) was a decisive military engagement between Belgian revolutionary and Austrian forces at Turnhout in the Austrian Netherlands (modern-day Belgium). It was the first engagement of the Brabant Revolution and took place shortly after the revolutionary (patriot) army of Jean-André van der Mersch crossed the border from the Dutch Republic where it had previously been in exile. Their unlikely victory in the engagement led to the rapid collapse of Austrian rule across the Southern Netherlands and the temporary withdrawal of Austrian forces in the region to Luxembourg.

== Background ==
Joseph II, Holy Roman Emperor was an important figure of European Enlightenment and a believer in reforming institutions he believed to be outdated. As the head of Habsburg Austria and ruler of the Austrian Netherlands, he decreed a wide-reaching programme of reforms: Josephinism. He imposed his own policies in the internal affairs of the Church. Furthermore, he published a number of edicts reforming the law and administration of the territory with the aim of re-enforcing the power of the state.

These laws were received reluctantly by the people and the church, the bourgeois however saw them as an attack on their democracy and civil rights. In response, a movement of protests against Austrian rule appeared. In January 1789, the states of Brabant and Hainaut refused to pay imperial taxes. The Imperial response was an occupation of the County of Hainaut and a suspension of the rights guaranteed to the Duchy of Brabant on 18 June 1789. The Austrian military governor Count Richard d'Alton judged it useful to concentrate his troops in De Kempen and around Liège, leaving much of the remainder the Austrian Netherlands thinly protected.

In May 1789, the secret society Pro aris et focis was founded in Brussels with the aim of gathering resistance against the emperor. At the same time, the Brabançons gathered an army in the United Provinces commanded by Jean-André van der Mersch. The army moved into Hoogstraten in Belgium without meeting severe Austrian opposition. In the town, Henri Van der Noot read the Manifesto of the People of Brabant proclaiming the end of Austrian control of the Southern Netherlands. Van der Noot proclaimed that the attack on southern Netherlands was a reaction to the Austrian Emperor who had not complied with the rights guaranteed by the Joyous Entry of 1356.

== Battle ==
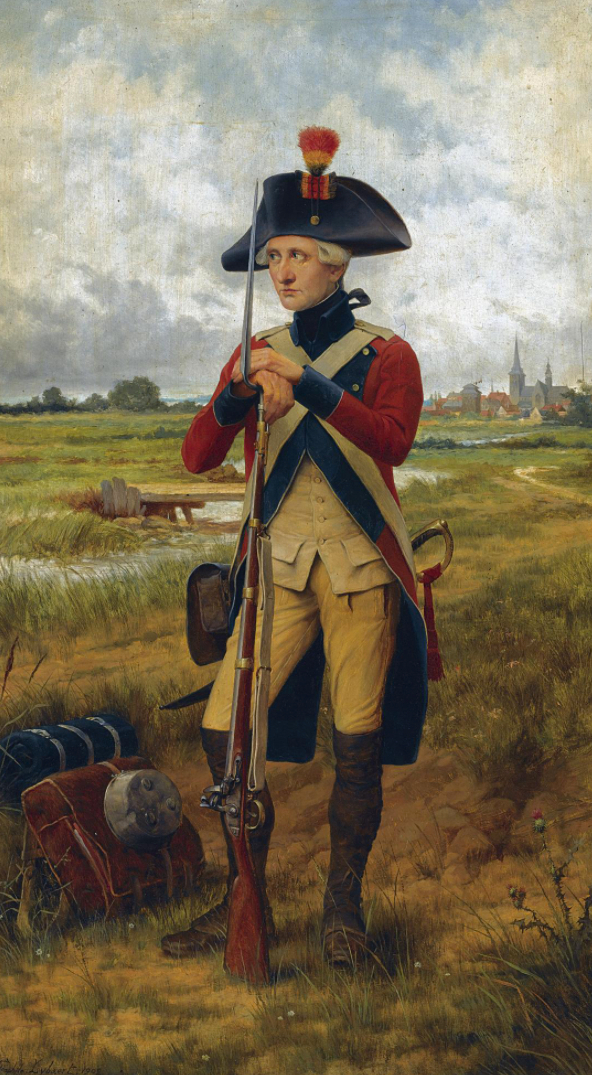
1902 painting of a Patriot soldier at the battle

In October 1789, one of the two "divisions" of the patriotic army marched towards Brabant. It arrived in, and easily captured, Turnhout on the 25th. They had just left the town when they were informed that an Austrian force was moving towards them. Van der Mersch knew that a battle in open country would be futile and decided that his best chance would be to hold the town and fight in the streets, reducing the numerical advantage of the Austrian forces.

With the help of Emmanuel-Joseph Van Gansen, son of a brewer in Westerlo, the inhabitants of the town threw up barricades in the streets. A group took position in the square and another at the entrance to the town near a mill. The town of Turnhout was besieged by the Austrians on 27 October and a violent combat took place. As van der Meersch had hoped, the Austrian forces were not well prepared for fighting in the town itself and, after five hours of fighting, they were forced to retreat, leaving behind five cannons.

== Aftermath ==
News of the victory at Turnhout spread over the Flanders and Brabant and resistance increased. The Brabant Revolution became a reality. The towns of Ghent, Diest, Tienen, and Brussels fell to the rebels. Austrian forces withdrew to the Duchy of Luxembourg. On 31 December Brabant declared its own independence and was joined, in January 1790, by many other Belgian states leading to the creation of the United Belgian States.

Each year in the Turnhout battle is commemorated with a spectacle in the Gasthuisstraat, the location where the fighting was fiercest. A memorial by P. Brozius in the Market of Turnhout recalls this battle. The stone dates from 1889, on the occasion of the celebration of 100 years Battle of Turnhout.
