= Empire of Charles V =

Territory ruled by Charles V of Habsburg from 1519 to 1556

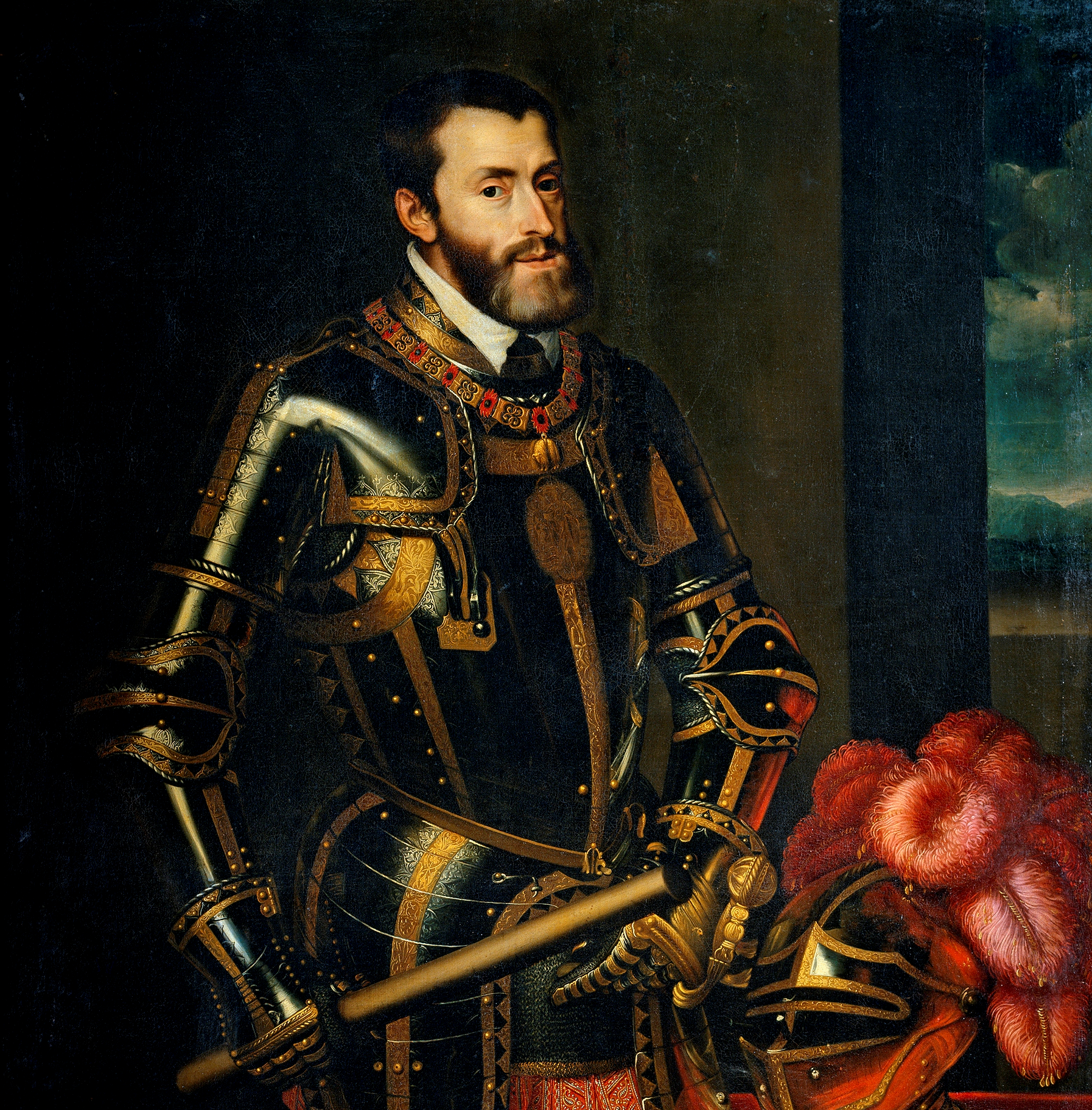
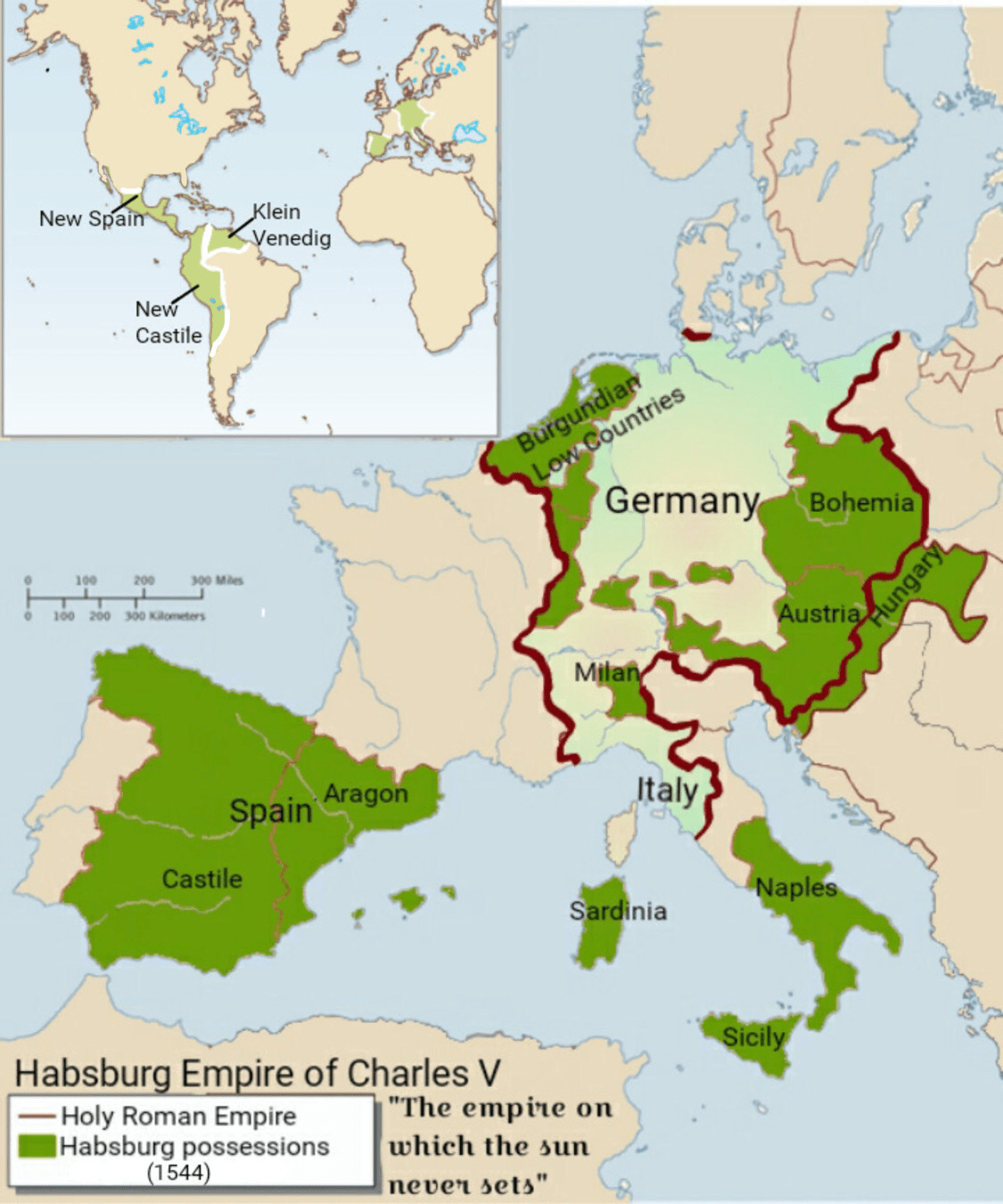
Left: Portrait of Charles V wearing armour by Juan Pantoja de la Cruz.
Right: The empire of Charles V at its peak after the Peace of Crépy in 1544.

The Empire of Charles V, also known as the Habsburg Empire, included the Habsburg hereditary lands in central Europe, the kingdoms of Spain, the colonial Spanish Empire, the kingdom of Naples, the Habsburg Netherlands and other territories and principalities across Europe. It is sometimes considered to include, in addition, the kingdoms of Bohemia and Hungary which were held by Charles's brother Ferdinand during his reign. In 1519, Charles was elected Holy Roman Emperor and, as such, was suzerain of the states of the Holy Roman Empire.

The empire was the first to be labelled as "the empire on which the sun never sets", a term used to describe several global empires throughout history. The lands of the empire had in common only the monarch, Charles V, while their boundaries, institutions, and laws remained distinct. Charles's nomenclature as Holy Roman Emperor was Charles V (also Karl V and Carolus V), though earlier in his life he was known by the names of Charles of Ghent (after his birthplace in Flanders), Charles II as Duke of Burgundy, and Charles I as King of Spain (Carlos I) and Archduke of Austria (Karl I). The imperial name prevailed due to the politico-religious primacy held by the Holy Roman Empire among European monarchies since the Middle Ages, which Charles V intended to preserve as part of his (ultimately failed) project to unite Christendom under his leadership.

Charles V inherited the states comprising his empire as a result of the ambitious Habsburg matrimonial policy, engaged in extensive warfare during his reign, especially against Francis I of France and Francis I's Muslim ally, Ottoman Sultan Suleiman the Magnificent, and had to face the Protestant Reformation of Martin Luther. His empire expanded in the Americas with the Spanish conquest of the Aztec Empire and the Inca Empire. He had access to vast resources consisting of flows of silver from the Americas to Spain, loans received from German and Italian bankers, and financial revenues of his states, especially the rich Low Countries; he used this wealth to wage war in Europe, but failed to contain religious divisions and French and Ottoman hostility, while his regime became more and more indebted and suffered from inflation. Ruling a vast empire as an itinerant monarch, he was assisted by many collaborators and entrusted oversight of his realms to his close relatives; ultimately he abdicated and divided the component states of his empire, with his brother Ferdinand succeeding him as Holy Roman Emperor and his son Philip inheriting the Spanish territories and the Low Countries.

== Inheritances of Charles V ==
You, noble prince Charles, are more blessed than Alexander the Great. He for his part had seized an immense empire, but not without bloodshed...you were born to a splendid empire...and no one suffered for it.

— Erasmus of Rotterdam in Education of a Christian Prince

=== Birth and heritage ===
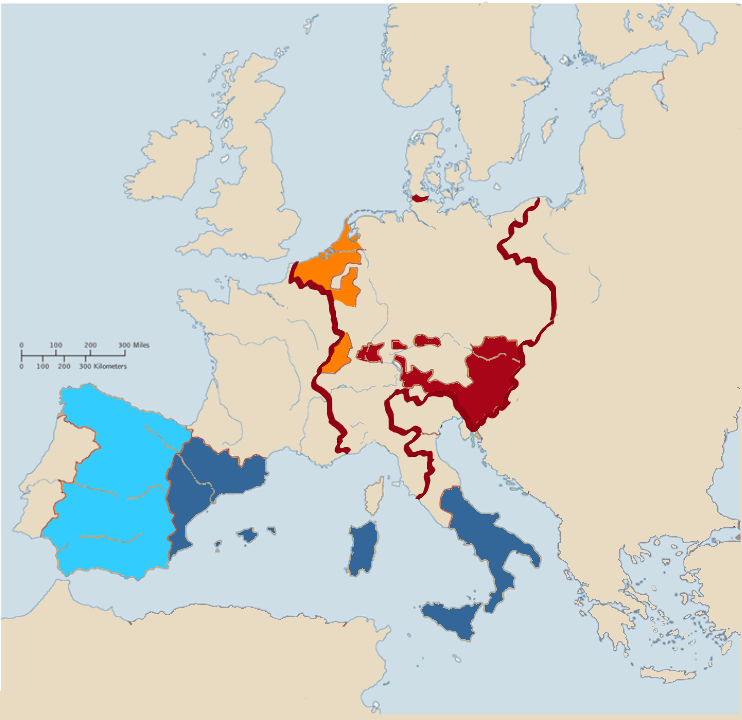
European inheritances of Charles V in 1519: Burgundian lands in orange, the Crown of Castile in light blue, realms of the Crown of Aragon dark blue, Austrian realms in dark red, borders of the Empire in red.

Charles of Habsburg was born on 24 February 1500 in the Prinsenhof of Ghent, a Flemish city of the Low Countries, to Archduke Philip of Habsburg and Princess Joanna of Trastámara. His father Philip, nicknamed Philip the Handsome, was the firstborn son of Maximilian I of Habsburg, Archduke of Austria as well as Holy Roman Emperor, and Mary the Rich, Burgundian duchess of the Low Countries. His mother Joanna, known as Joanna the Mad for the mental disorders afflicting her, was a daughter of Ferdinand II of Aragon and Isabella I of Castile, the Catholic Monarchs of Spain from the House of Trastámara. The political marriage of Philip and Joanna was first conceived in a letter sent by Maximilian to Ferdinand in order to seal an Austro-Spanish alliance, established as part of the League of Venice directed against the Kingdom of France during the Italian Wars.

The organization of ambitious political marriages reflected Maximilian's practice to expand the House of Habsburg with dynastic links rather than conquest, as exemplified by his saying "Let others wage war, you, happy Austria, marry". The marriage contract between Philip and Joanna was signed in 1495, and celebrations were held in 1496. Philip was already titular duke of Burgundy, given Mary's death in 1482, and also heir apparent of Austria as honorific archduke. Joanna, on the other hand, was only third in the Spanish line of succession, preceded by her older brother John, Prince of Asturias and older sister Isabella of Aragon. Although both John and Isabella died in 1498, the Catholic Monarchs desired to keep the Spanish kingdoms in Iberian hands and designated their Portuguese grandson Miguel da Paz as heir presumptive of Spain by naming him prince of Asturias. Only a series of dynastic accidents eventually favored Maximilian's project.

Charles was born in a bathroom of the Prinsenhof at 3:00 a.m. not long after Joanna had attended a ball, despite symptoms of labor pains. His name was chosen by Philip in honour of Charles I of Burgundy. According to a poet at the court, the people of Ghent "shouted Austria and Burgundy throughout the whole city for three hours" to celebrate his birth. Given the dynastic situation, the newborn was originally heir apparent only of the Low Countries as the honorific duke of Luxembourg and became known in his early years simply as Charles of Ghent. He was baptized at the Saint Bavo's Cathedral by the Bishop of Tournai: Charles I de Croÿ and John III of Glymes were his godfathers; Margaret of York, Duchess of Burgundy and Margaret of Austria, Duchess of Savoy his godmothers. Charles's baptism gifts were a sword and a helmet, objects of Burgundian chivalric tradition representing, respectively, the instrument of war and the symbol of peace.

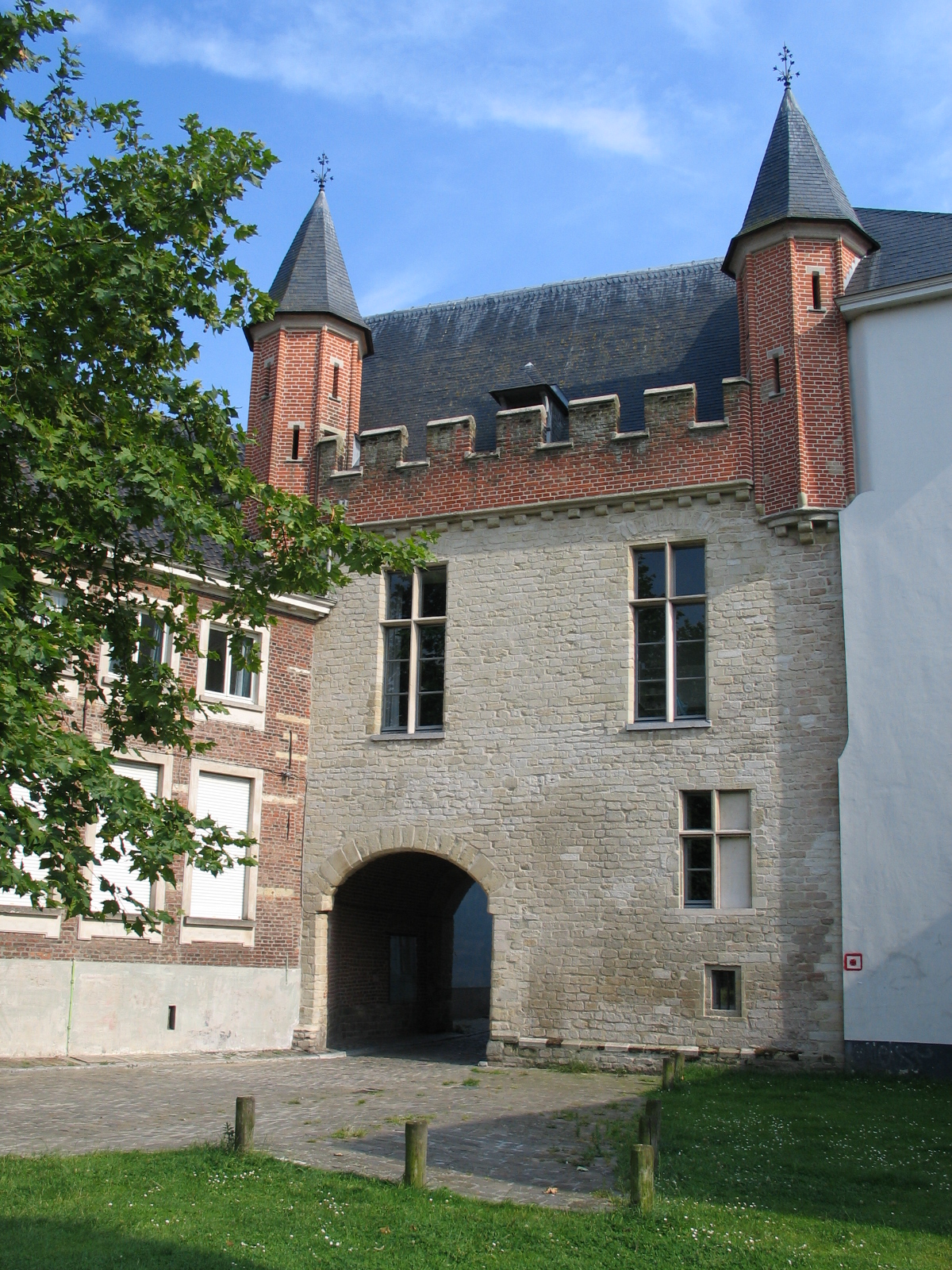
Entrance gate to the Prinsenhof (Flemish Dutch; literally "Princes' court") in Ghent, where Charles was born.

In 1501, Philip and Joanna left Charles to the custody of Margaret of York and went to Spain. They returned to visit their son very rarely, and thus Charles grew up in the Low Countries practically without his parents. The main goal of their Spanish mission was the recognition of Joanna as Princess of Asturias, given Prince Miguel's death a year earlier. They succeeded despite facing some opposition from the Castilian Cortes, reluctant to create the premises for Habsburg succession. In 1504, as Isabella died, Joanna became Queen of Castile. Philip was recognized king in 1506 but died shortly after, an event that drove the mentally unstable Joanna into complete insanity. She retired in isolation into a tower of Tordesillas. Ferdinand took control of all the Spanish kingdoms, under the pretext of protecting Charles's rights, which in reality he wanted to elude, but his new marriage with Germaine de Foix failed to produce a surviving Trastámara heir to the throne. With his father dead and his mother confined, Charles became titular duke of Burgundy and was recognized as prince of Asturias (heir presumptive of Spain) and honorific archduke (heir apparent of Austria).

=== Low Countries ===
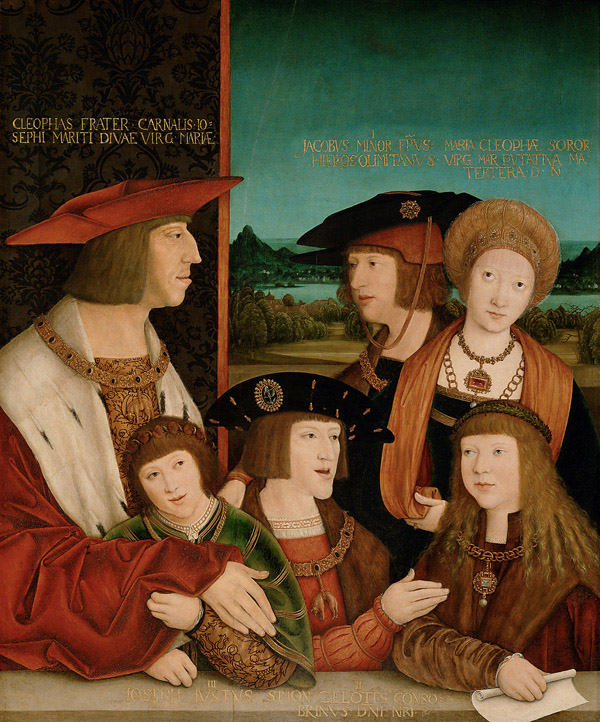
A painting representing the extended Habsburg family, with a young Charles in the middle.

The Burgundian inheritance in the Low Countries, also called "Netherlands", "Flanders", or "Belgica", were Charles's homeland and originally included Flanders, Artois, Brabant, Limburg, Luxembourg, Hainaut, Holland, Namur, Mechelen, and Zeeland. Charles inherited those territories, as well as the exclaves of Franche-Comté and Charolais, when his father Philip died. On 15 October 1506, he was named Lord of the Netherlands as Duke Charles II of Burgundy by the States General of the Netherlands. The remaining provinces of the Low Countries, initially outside of Charles's jurisdiction, were Guelders, Friesland, Utrecht, Overijssel, Groningen, Drenthe, and Zutphen. Another territory not included in the Burgundian inheritance was Burgundy proper, annexed by France in 1477. As a young lord, Charles grew up with two major political goals: recover Burgundy proper and unite the Seventeen Provinces of the Low Countries under sole Habsburg rule. By the end of his reign, he would have failed in the former objective but succeeded in the latter.

The Low Countries held an important place in Europe for their strategic location, and the wealthy Flemish cities were flourishing in trade and experiencing a transition to capitalism. Although located within the Holy Roman Empire and its borders, those territories were formally divided between fiefs of the German kingdom and French fiefs (such as Charles's birthplace of Flanders) and thus formed, as Henri Pirenne put it, "a state made up of the frontier provinces of two kingdoms". Given that Charles ascended to the ducal throne as a minor, Emperor Maximilian appointed Margaret of Austria, Duchess of Savoy (Charles's aunt and Maximilian's daughter) as his guardian and regent. Charles viewed and treated Margaret as his mother and grew up in her Hof van Savoye in Mechelen along with his sisters. Margaret soon found herself in conflict with France over the question of Charles's requirement to pay homage to the French king in his position as duke of Burgundy and count of Flanders.

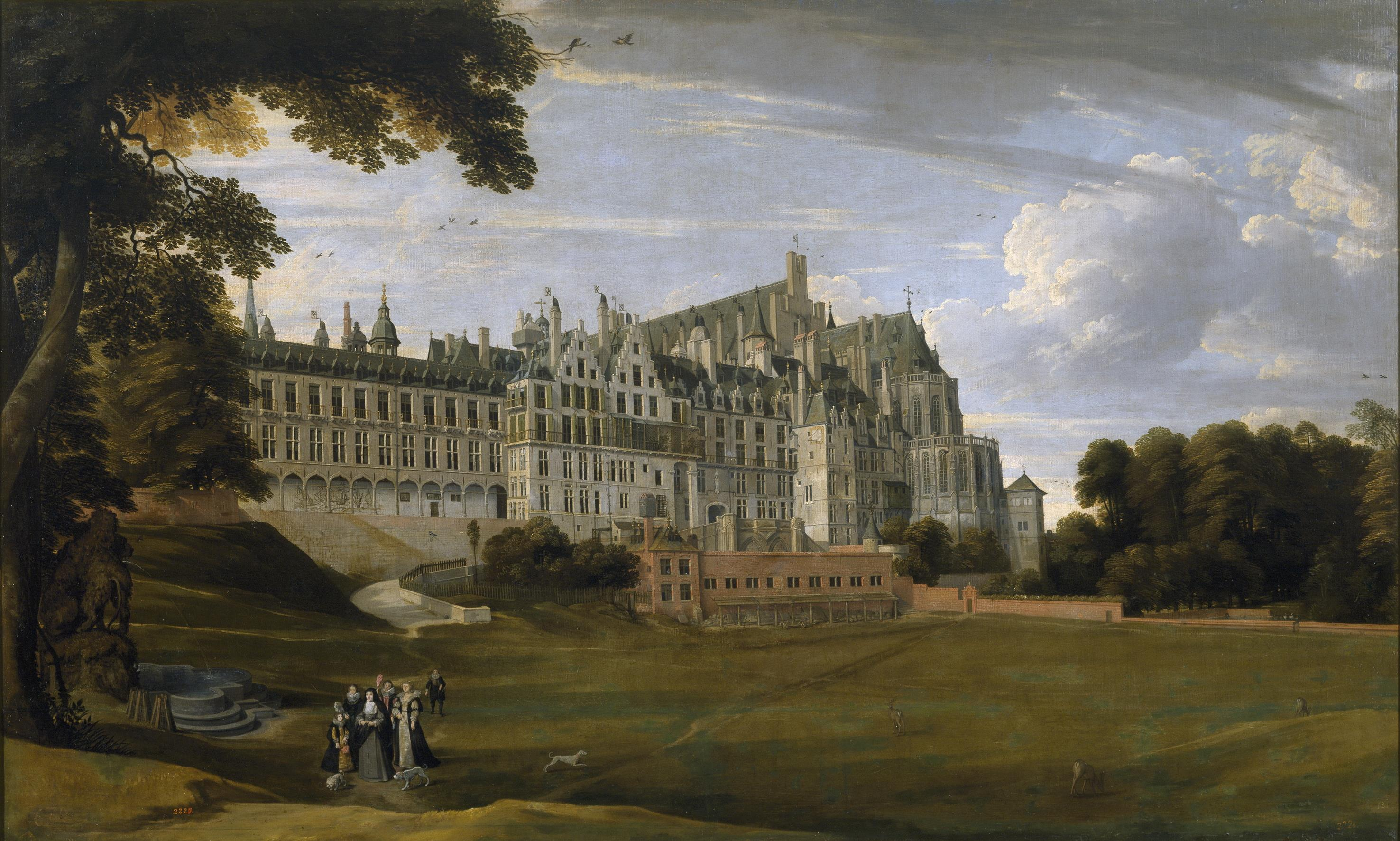
The Palace of Coudenberg in Brussels was the main residence of Charles V in the Low Countries.

Charles's entourage, which consisted of hundreds of members, was composed primarily of fellow countrymen such as his chamberlain William de Croÿ and his tutor Adrian of Utrecht. Because of this, the young duke grew up speaking exclusively his native languages: French and Dutch. Very important to Charles was the Burgundian Order of the Golden Fleece, a forum of knights and nobles of which he was a member and later the grand master. The basis of Charles's beliefs was formed in this environment, including his Burgundian chivalric culture and the desire of Christian unity to fight the infidel in the tradition of medieval figures born in the Low Countries such as Charlemagne and Godfrey of Bouillon, whose biographies he often read.

Emperor Maximilian decided to emancipate his grandson in 1515 at the great hall of the Coudenberg Palace in Brussels, where Charles would abdicate 40 years later. Once emancipated, he undertook his first voyage to tour the Burgundian provinces and made an acclaimed Joyous Entry in Bruges and other Flemish cities. Meanwhile, he refused to attend the coronation ceremony of the new king of France Francis I of Valois as a French vassal. This event marked the first episode of a long rivalry between the two monarchs.

=== Spanish kingdoms ===
In 1479, Spain was formed as a dynastic union of two crowns by virtue of the marriage and joint rule of Isabella I of Castile and Ferdinand II of Aragon, the Trastámara Catholic Monarchs. Upon the death of King Ferdinand II on 23 January 1516, his daughter Joanna the Mad, formally queen of Castile since the death of Isabella in 1504 but effectively under her father's protection, became queen of Aragon as well. Ferdinand's testament recognized Joanna as sole queen of the Spanish kingdoms with Charles as governor-general and Cardinal Francisco Jiménez de Cisneros as regent. Joanna's condition of insanity persisted and, as suggested by the Flemings and Maximilian, Charles claimed for himself the Spanish kingdoms jure matris. After the celebration of Ferdinand II's obsequies on 14 March 1516, Charles was crowned king in the Church of St. Michael and St. Gudula (now Brussels' cathedral) as Charles I of Spain or Charles I of Castile and Aragon, controlling both Spanish crowns in personal union.

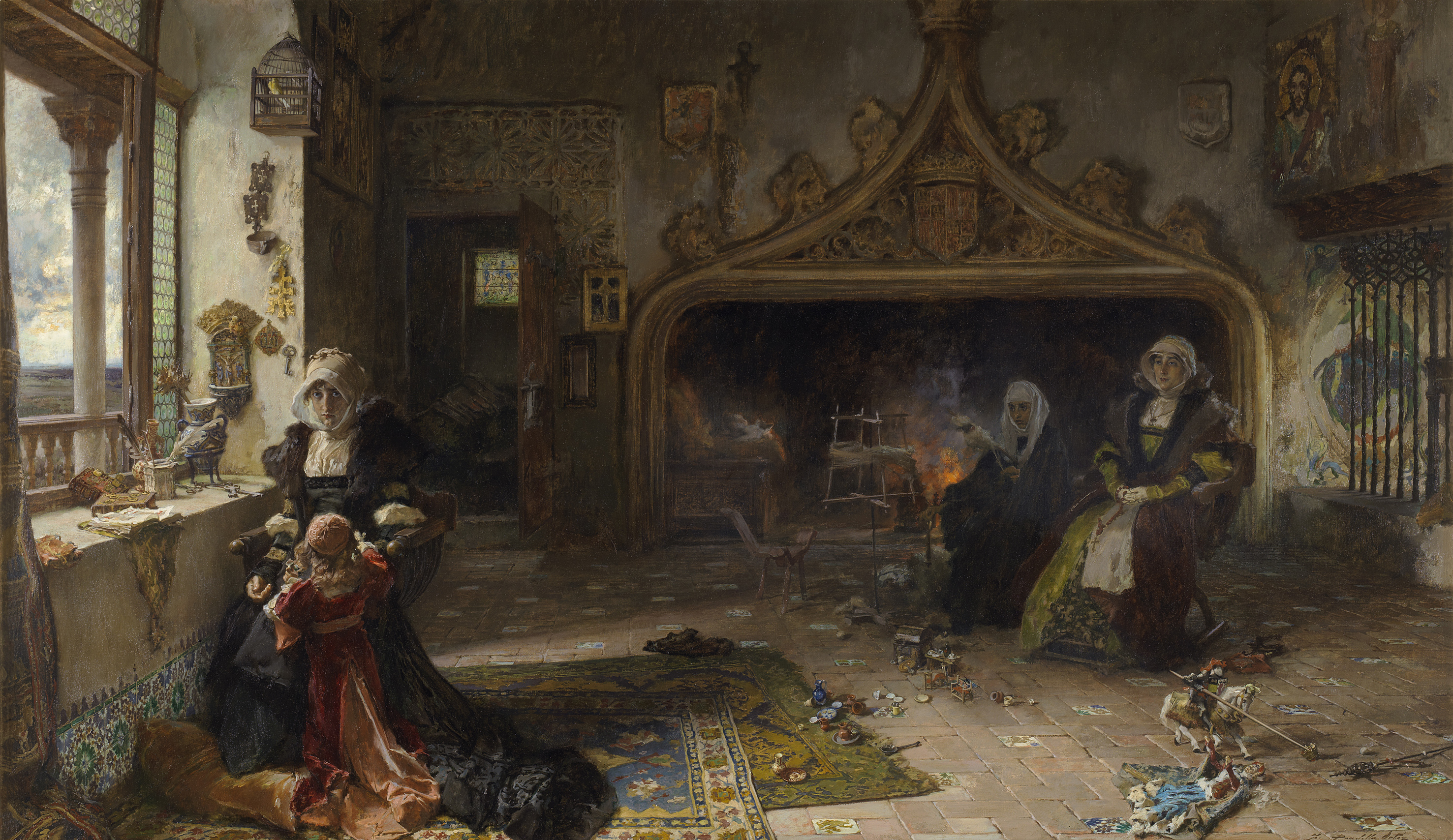
Joanna confined in Tordesillas.

The Spanish kingdoms varied in their style and traditions. The Crown of Castile was an increasingly authoritarian state where the monarch's own will easily overrode legislative and justice institutions. Its crown comprised most of Spain, including the Iberian Navarre conquered in 1512 and the former Islamic Kingdom of Granada annexed at the end of the Reconquista in 1492. The Crown of Aragon itself was a personal union which included the remaining Spanish kingdoms of Aragon proper, Valencia and the Principality of Catalonia, and its monarchy was considered to be, differently from Castile and similarly to Navarre, the product of a contract with the people. Viceroyalties of the Spanish crowns formed the Spanish Empire and included the West Indies and the Tierra Firme in the Americas, discovered by Christopher Columbus for Castile in 1492, as well as the Aragonese possessions in southern Italy: Sicily, Sardinia, and the recently conquered (1503) Kingdom of Naples.

In August 1516, Charles as king of Spain and Francis I of France made the Treaty of Noyon, which, along with the Treaty of Brussels between Charles's grandfather Emperor Maximilian I and Francis, ended the first phase of the Franco-Habsburg Italian Wars, leaving the Imperial Duchy of Milan in French hands and securing the Kingdom of Naples under Spanish rule. In the same year, the Italian humanist Luigi Marliani coined Charles's personal motto Plus Oultre (later incorrectly Latinized as Plus Ultra, which became the Spanish national motto), signifying "further beyond" and associated with the expansion of his inheritance as a reverse of the mythological Non Plus Ultra written on the Pillars of Hercules. A year later, Charles I embarked for Spain, where his accession was contested and a succession crisis was unfolding. This was his first voyage outside of the Low Countries; he arrived in his new kingdoms in September 1517. Jiménez de Cisneros accepted the fait accompli and came to meet him but fell ill along the way, not without suspicion of poison, and died before meeting the King. As regent, Cisneros was replaced by Charles's tutor Adrian of Utrecht, who was appointed Bishop of Tortosa and became himself a cardinal. Charles visited his mother in Tordesillas, and met for the first time his younger brother Ferdinand. Ferdinand had been born in Castile and was a popular candidate for king, but Charles ordered him to abandon Spain. Charles then entered into negotiations with the Cortes of Castile and of Aragon to be proclaimed king of the Spanish crowns jointly with his mother.

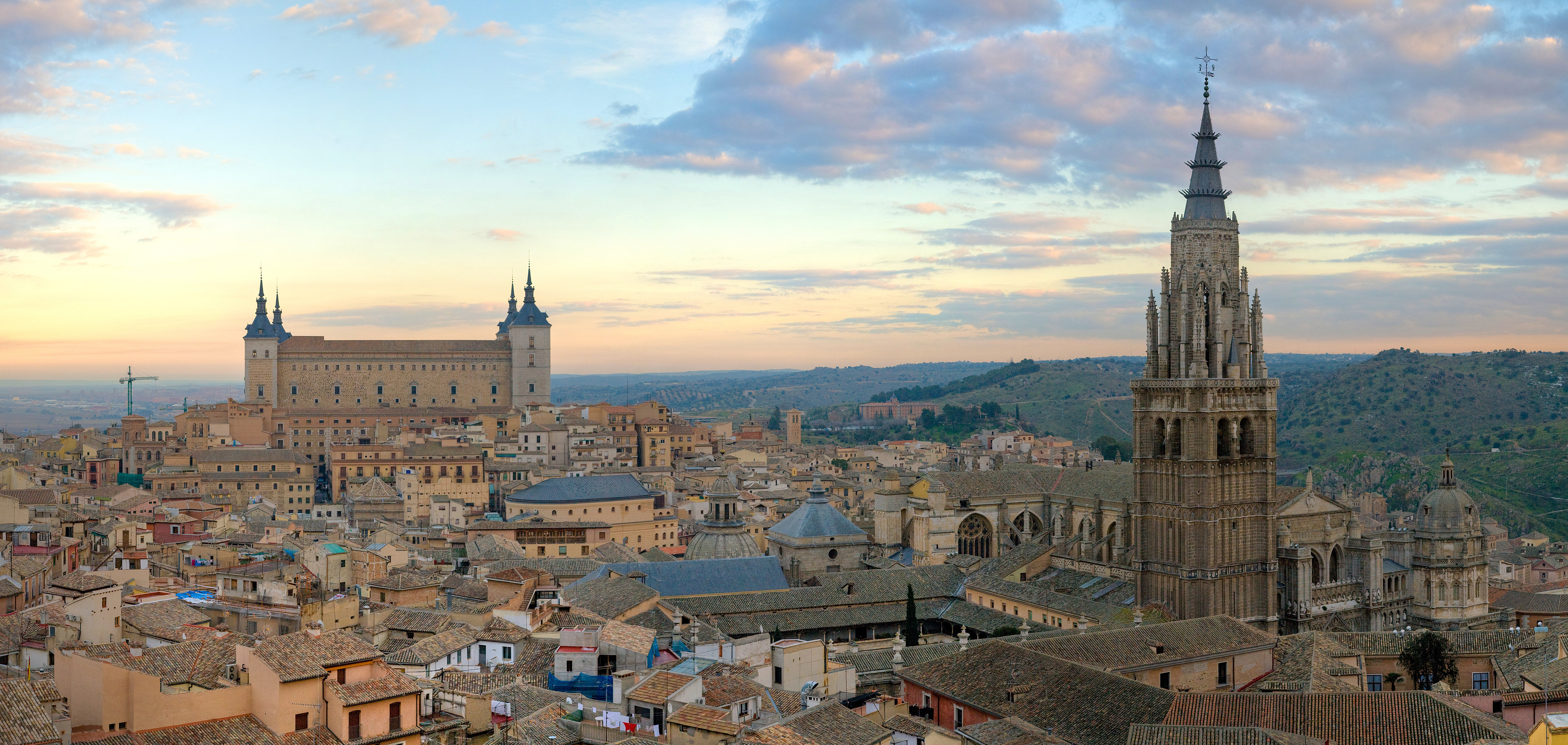
The city of Toledo was the main residence of Charles V in Spain.

At his arrival in Spain, Charles was seen as a foreign prince of Flemish-Austrian background and his Burgundian-Habsburg entourage was accused of exploiting the resources and offices of the Spanish kingdoms. For this reason, and due to the irregularities of Charles assuming the royal title while his mother was alive, the negotiations with the Castilian Cortes in Valladolid proved difficult. Eventually, the Cortes accepted Charles as king and paid homage to him in Valladolid in February 1518. Charles proceeded to Aragon, and once again, he overcame the resistance of that Cortes and was recognized as king. A year later, he was still negotiating with the Corts Catalanes to be recognized as Count of Barcelona, and had not attended, despite requests, similar ceremonies in Valencia and Navarre, causing some grievances. Even after recognizing him as king, the Cortes of Castile and of Aragon sought to impose conditions on Charles. In 1519, he agreed that he would learn to speak Spanish, would cease to appoint foreigners to the high offices of Spain, was prohibited from taking more than a fifth (Quinto Real) of the precious metals coming from the Americas, and would respect the rights of his mother Joanna as queen and co-monarch. In fact, Joanna had little effect on the government, as she was kept imprisoned until her death in 1555.

=== Austrian lands and Imperial election ===
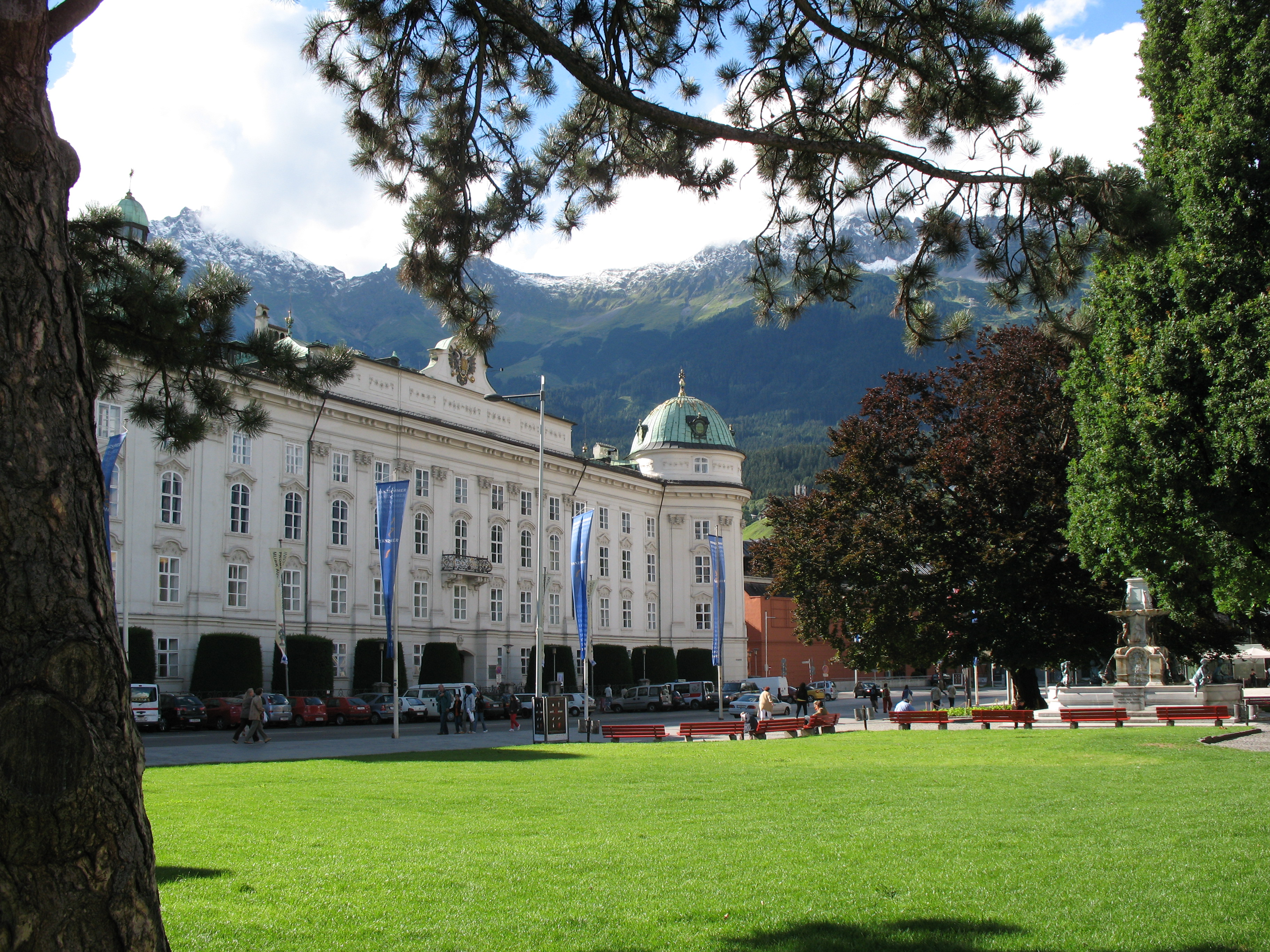
The Hofburg palace in Innsbruck was the main residence of Charles V in Austria.

When Maximilian died on 12 January 1519, Charles became archduke of Austria and head of the House of Habsburg. As Charles I of Austria, he inherited the Archduchy of Austria, Duchy of Styria, County of Tyrol, Further Austria, Duchy of Carinthia, Duchy of Carniola, and the Austrian Littoral. As head of the House, he inherited the Imperial ideology exemplified by the dynastic motto A.E.I.O.U (meaning, according to one interpretation, Austria Est Imperare Orbi Universo - "Austria is to rule the whole world"). Charles put forward his candidacy to the seven prince-electors (Palatinate, Saxony, Brandenburg, Mainz, Trier, Cologne, and Bohemia) in order to succeed his grandfather as Holy Roman Emperor, a title held by the Habsburg archdukes of Austria since 1440.

The Holy Roman Empire was also known as the Holy Roman Empire of the German Nation and its greatest constituent realm was the Kingdom of Germany, divided into many princedoms, bishoprics, free cities, and other polities. The other large constituent kingdom was Italy, formed by several regional states to the north of the Papal States. Francis I of France, fearing that Charles's election might result in the loss of French-held Milan and in the Habsburg Encirclement of his kingdom, attempted to secure the Imperial throne for himself through bribery. Pope Leo X, uneasy with the accumulation of power in Habsburg or French hands, invited various other princes to enter the electoral race, hoping for the victory of a third candidate. Nonetheless, Leo X also signed secret alliances with both Charles and Francis in case one of them won the Imperial election, marking the first episode of Papal double-play in the French-Habsburg rivalry.

Charles borrowed large amounts of money from the Fuggers and the Welsers, the two major German banking families, and surpassed Francis in the race to pay bigger bribes to the electors. He also signed with the German princes an electoral capitulation (Wahlkapitulation) in which he promised to "protect and shield" Germany's liberties and began to learn German, Italian, and Latin. Finally, Charles advised the princes against electing a foreign king and declared himself a "German by blood and stock" on the ground that Austria, the home of his dynasty, and the Low Countries, where he was born, were then considered part of Germany.

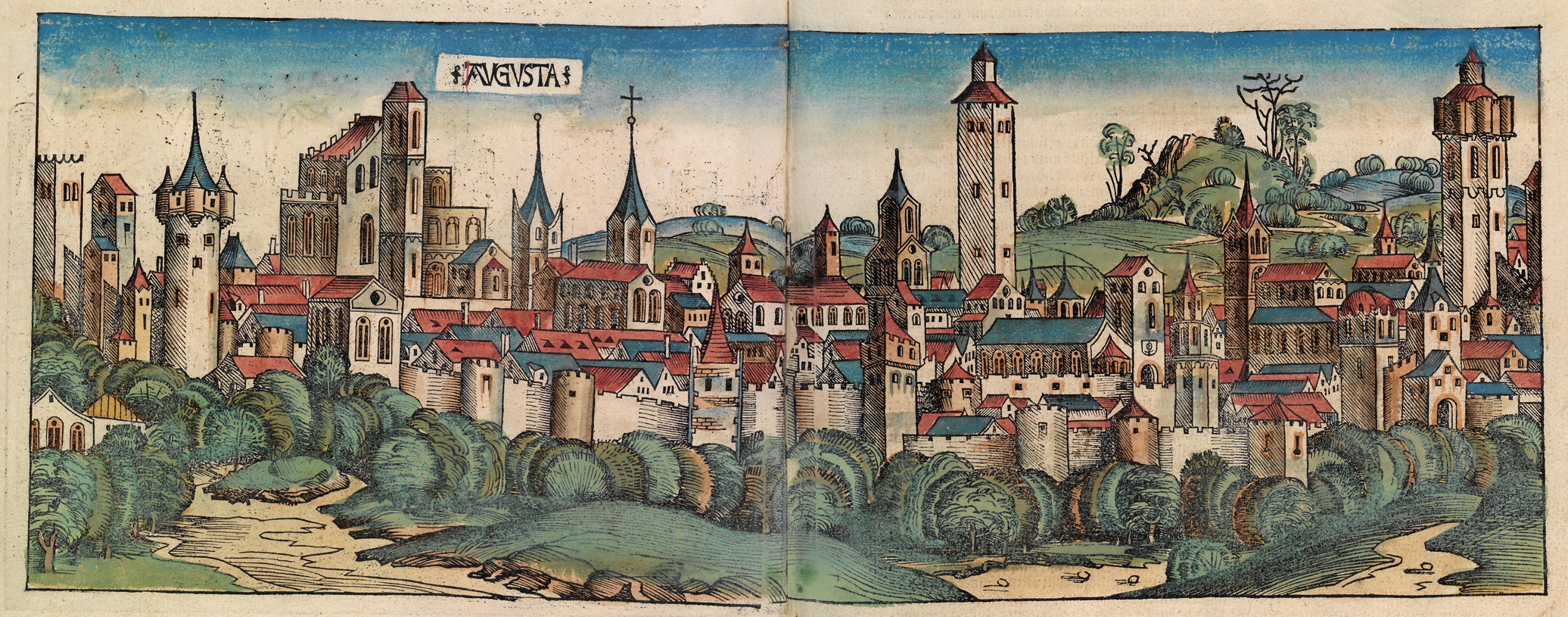
Panorama of 16th-century Augsburg, the main residence of Charles V in Germany.

On 28 June 1519, Charles was elected Emperor by the prince-electors in Frankfurt. A Papal dispensation, similar to one granted to Maximilian in 1508, allowed him to use the Imperial title even in absence of Papal coronation. Informed of the election by Frederick II of the Palatinate, Charles proclaimed the Imperial title to be "so great and sublime an honour to outshine all other worldly titles" and thus became universally known by the Imperial name of Charles V.

== Imperial project and Reformation ==
=== Coronation in Aachen ===
The traditional ideology of the Holy Roman Empire implied sovereignty over the entire Christian world. However, such a theoretical claim was never implemented in practice. The Italian statesman Mercurino di Gattinara, a Piedmontese counsellor of Margaret of Austria, Duchess of Savoy, known for his appreciation of Dante Alighieri's political treatise De Monarchia, reproposed the medieval idea and wrote to the Emperor:

"Sire, God has been very merciful to you: he has raised you above all the kings and princes of Christendom to a power such as no sovereign has enjoyed since your ancestor Charles the Great. He has set you on the way towards a world monarchy, towards the uniting of all Christendom under a single shepherd."

Charles V endorsed the project and appointed Gattinara grand-chancellor of the Empire. Given that his dynastic fortunes gave him sovereignty in much of Western Europe and in the Americas, the Emperor believed it was his divine mission to transform the medieval dream into reality.

He left a tumultuous situation in Spain, where the revolt of the Comuneros in Castille and the revolt of the Brotherhoods in Aragon broke out among the lower classes to contest Habsburg rule, and returned to the Low Countries in 1520 via England. In two meetings with Henry VIII, first in Canterbury and then in Gravelines, he dissuaded the English king from joining an anti-Imperial alliance proposed by Francis I of France at the Field of the Cloth of Gold. Following a festival held at his Palace of Coudenberg in order to celebrate the election, Charles crossed the Rhine and arrived in Germany for the first time.

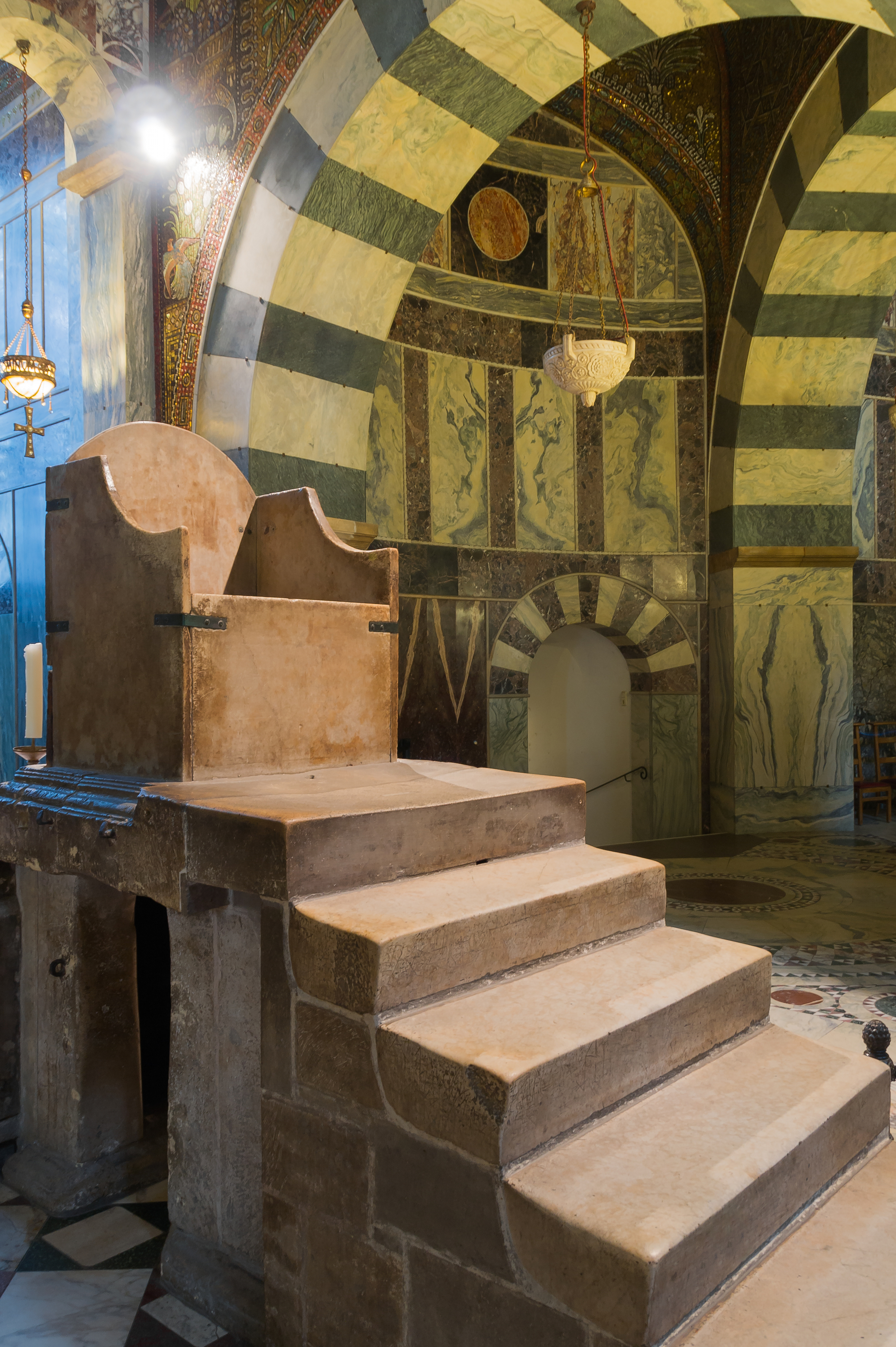
The throne of Charlemagne (Karlsthron) in Aachen, Germany, where Charles V wore the Imperial regalia and swore his oath as Holy Roman Emperor.

On 26 October 1520, Charles V was crowned King in Germany at the Palatine Chapel of Aachen Cathedral and swore his oath as Holy Roman Emperor. Seated on the throne of Charlemagne while holding the Imperial regalia, namely the globus cruciger in his right hand and the Carolingian sceptre in his left, he promised to defend and expand the Empire, administer justice, observe the Roman Catholic faith, and become the protector of the Church (Defensor Ecclesiae). Later he called for the first general meeting of German princes of his era, to be held in January 1521 at the Imperial Diet of Worms.

=== "The empire on which the sun never sets" ===
While Charles V assumed the functions of Holy Roman Emperor in Germany, the conquistador Hernán Cortés informed him of the ongoing Spanish conquest of the Aztec Empire, including the discovery of Tenochtitlan and the death of its ruler Moctezuma II during a local revolt, in a relation letter that widely circulated and became the basis of European knowledge on the Aztec Empire. At the same time, Ferdinand Magellan and later Juan Sebastian Elcano led an expedition that circumnavigated the world. Castilian colonialism in the Americas was developing since the 1490s and it was even proposed, although not realized, to construct an American Isthmus canal in Panama. These successes further convinced the Emperor of his divine mission to unify the world as the leader of Christendom. In his letter, Cortés claimed to have added to the empire as many provinces as Charles's Burgundian, Spanish, and Austrian ancestors, and described Mexico to be "no less worthy than Germany to warrant your assuming anew the title of Emperor, of which, by the grace of God, Your Sacred Majesty already possesses the title."

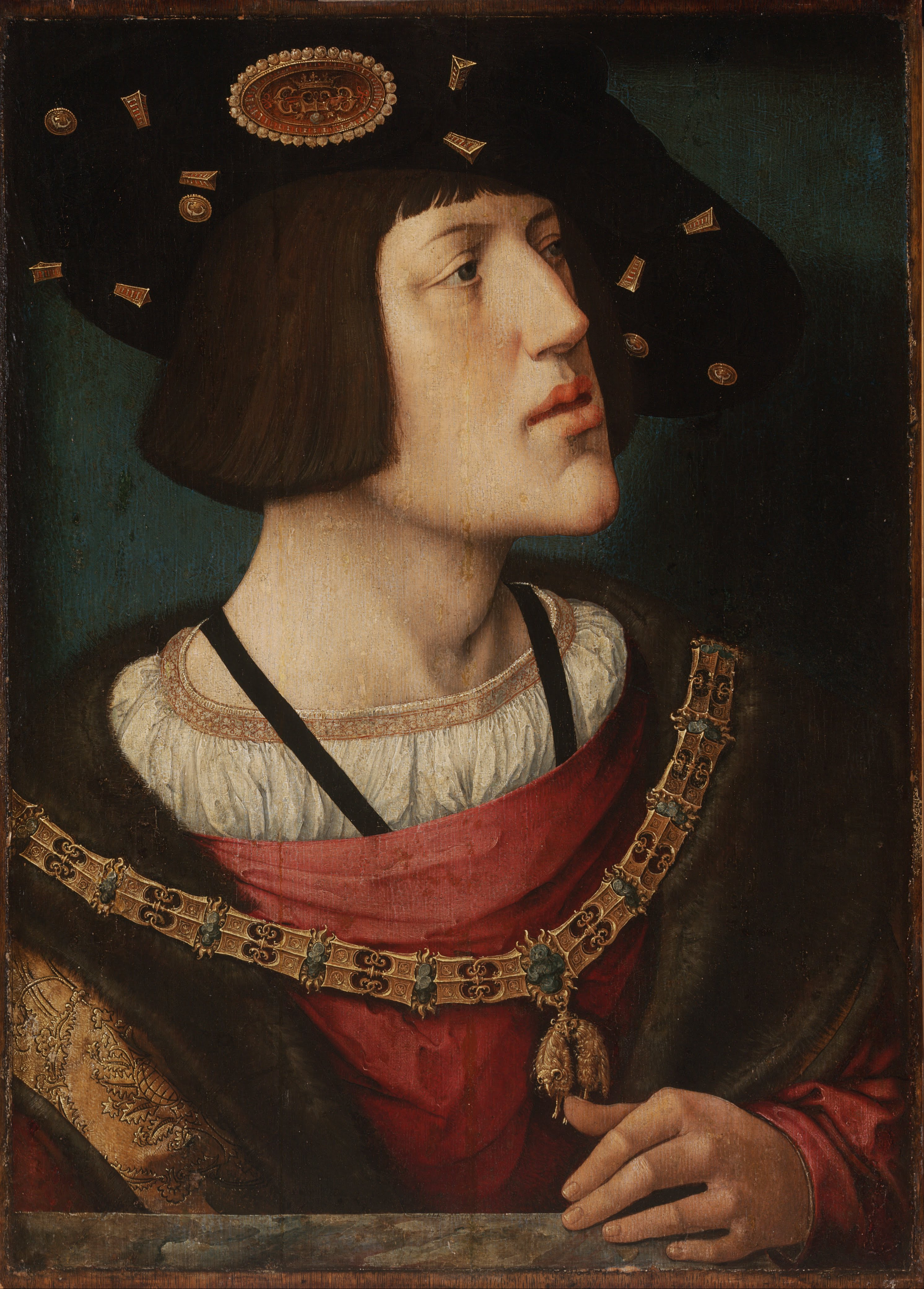
Portrait of Charles V, 1519. The insignia of the Order of the Golden Fleece are prominently displayed.

Charles V ratified the Spanish conquest of the Aztec Empire, and would also oversee the beginning of the Spanish conquest of Peru and the establishment of a brief German colony in Venezuela (Klein Venedig, 1528–1546). He regarded the Americas as a land to evangelize and, even more importantly, as a source of enormous amounts of bullion to strengthen the Imperial treasury. As the conquistador Bernal Díaz del Castillo observed, "We came to serve God and his Majesty, to give light to those in darkness, and also to acquire that wealth which most men covet."

Precious metals and treasures coming from the colonies were minted into coins in Spain, incidentally contributing to a period of inflation known as the "Spanish price revolution", and then transferred to the financial centres of the Low Countries in order to repay Charles's debts contracted with the local agencies of German and Italian bankers. Those resources contributed to sustain the wars of the Holy Roman Empire and to make the fortunes of Genoa and Augsburg (seat of the most important banks of the time), of Seville's Casa de la Moneda, and of the Flemish port city of Antwerp, which was the centre of the entire international economy. During Charles's reign, over 15 million ducats' worth of bullion reached the Imperial treasury but the rising inflation impacted the cost of borrowing which grew from 17% to 48%. Estimates concerning the fiscal revenues of Charles's European possessions vary significantly, with some authors even claiming that the 16th fiscal revenues of the Low Countries alone were equivalent to seven times the amount of resources collected in the Americas.

This financial system allowed Charles V to maintain a vast Imperial army of German landsknechts (the bulk of the army), Spanish tercios, Burgundian knights, and Italian condottieri. The universal empire of Charles V, called by poets "the empire on which the sun never sets", was also cosmopolitan in character: the Emperor was a travelling monarch and the itinerant Imperial court was open to men from all the Habsburg dominions. Therefore, Charles's counselors and generals included Germans (Henry III of Nassau-Breda, Frederick II, Elector Palatine, Albert Alcibiades, Margrave of Brandenburg-Kulmbach, John, Margrave of Brandenburg-Küstrin, Maurice of Saxony, Georg von Frundsberg), Spaniards (Hugo of Moncada, Fernando Álvarez de Toledo, 3rd Duke of Alba, Antonio de Guevara, Francisco de los Cobos y Molina, Alfonso de Valdés), Italians (Mercurino di Gattinara, Emmanuel Philibert, Duke of Savoy, Francesco Fernando d'Avalos, Alfonso d'Avalos, Andrea Doria, Ferrante Gonzaga), and Flemings (Charles de Lannoy, Philibert of Chalon, Adrian of Utrecht, William de Croÿ, Nicolas Perrenot de Granvelle, William the Silent). On other hand, Charles's dominions formed an "empire with no heartland" or a "hybrid empire" with multiple centres, suffering from the lack of a metropole and of a capital city in an age marked by the rise of more centralized national monarchies such as France and England.

=== Diet of Worms ===
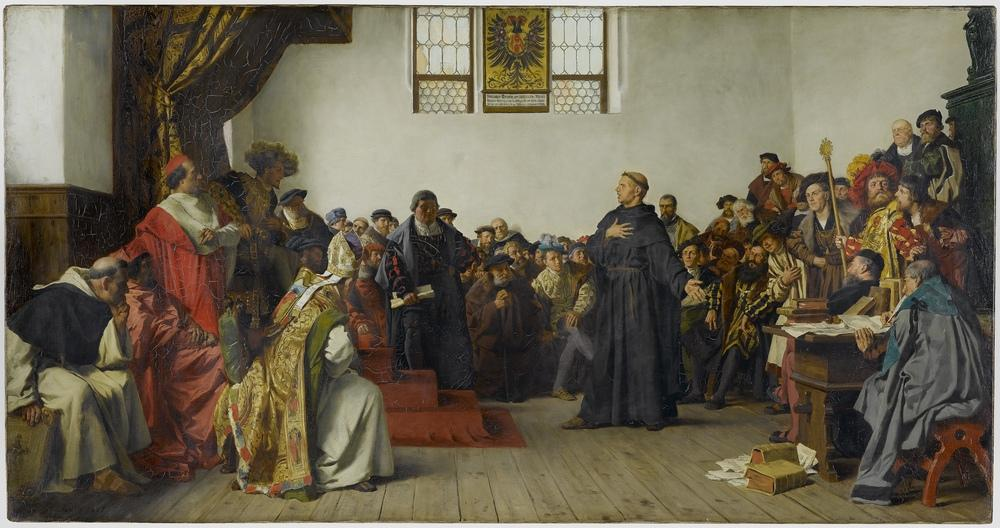
Luther at the Diet of Worms, by Anton von Werner, 1877

At the Diet of Worms, the Reformation movement was brought to the attention of Charles V. The Emperor called Martin Luther to the Diet, promising him safe conduct if he would appear to illustrate his theological positions. Charles V relied on religious unity to govern his various realms, otherwise unified only in his person, and resolved that Luther's teachings represented a disruptive form of heresy. After Luther defended The Ninety-Five Theses and his writings in front of Charles V, the Emperor commented: "that monk will never make a heretic of me!”. Influenced by the Papal legate Girolamo Aleandro, Charles V outlawed Luther and issued the Edict of Worms (26 May 1521), making a declaration reflective not only of his thought on the matter but of his world view in general:

"You know that my ancestors were the most Christian Emperors of the great nation of Germany, the Catholic kings of Spain, the archdukes of Austria, and the dukes of Burgundy, who all were, until death, faithful sons of the Roman Church...I am therefore resolved to maintain everything which these my forebears have established to the present…and to settle this matter I will use all my dominions and possessions, my friends, my body, my blood, my life, and my soul. It would be a disgrace for you and me, the illustrious and renowned nation of Germany, privileged and pre-eminent as protector and defender of the Catholic faith, if heresy, or even just the suspicion of heresy, and the degradation of the Christian religion were to return to the hearts of men in our time to our perpetual dishonour."

Nonetheless, Charles V kept his word and Martin Luther was free to leave the city by virtue of the Imperial safe conduct. However, Frederick III, Elector of Saxony, a patron of the Reformation, lamented the outcome of the Diet. On the road back from Worms, Luther was kidnapped by Frederick's men and hidden in a far away castle in Wartburg. There, he began to work on his German translation of the Bible. Several princes, intending to gain possession of the resources and lands of the Catholic Church in Germany, joined the Lutheran movement. A new religious denomination was emerging, but Charles V initially remained unaware of its spread as he was mostly concerned with the Italian Wars against France.

== Italian Wars with France ==
=== Four Years' War ===
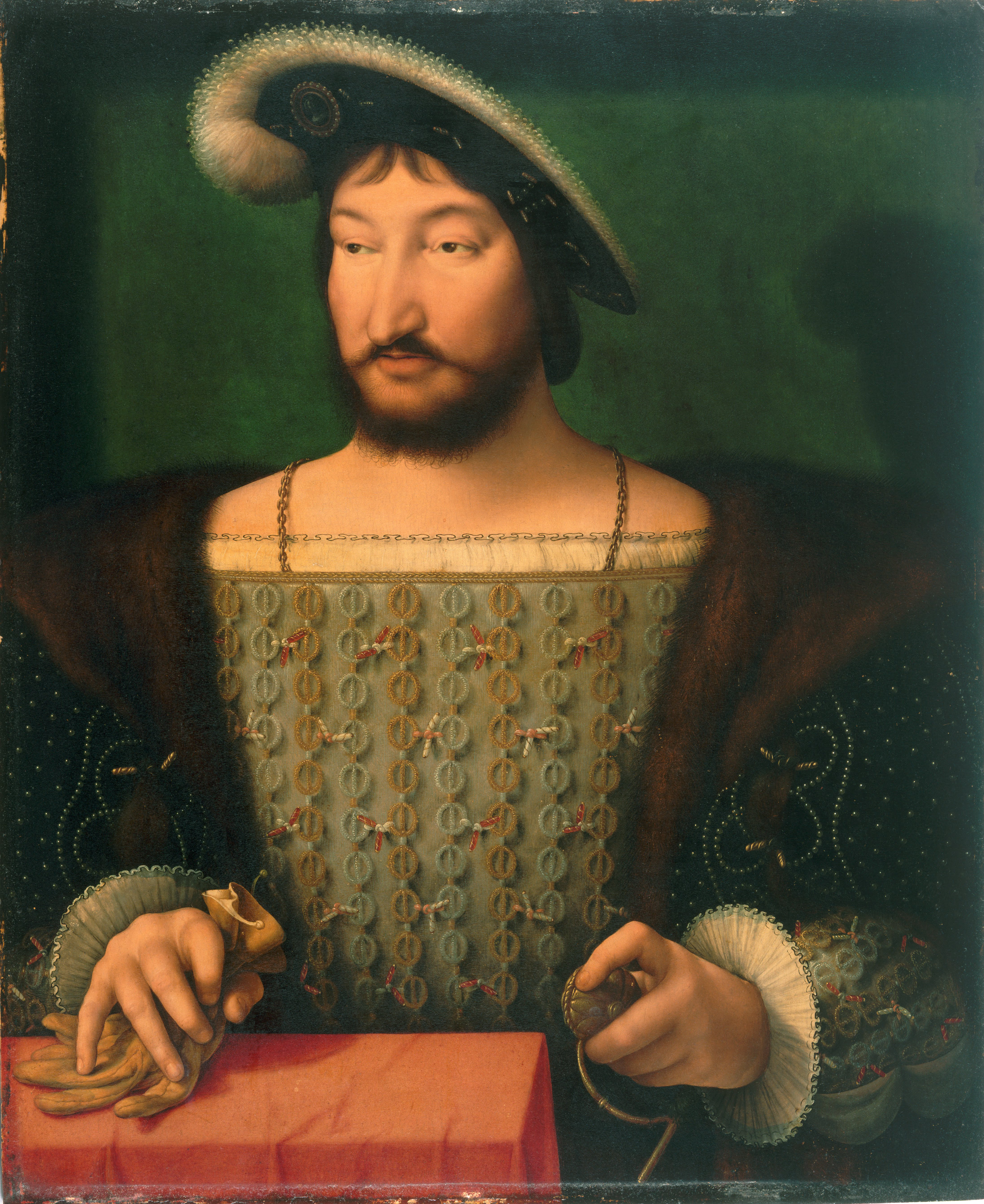
Portrait of Francis I of France.

While Charles V presided the Diet of Worms, Francis I of France sent his general Robert de la Marck to invade the Habsburg Netherlands and supported Henry II of Navarre in a campaign to recover the Iberian Kingdom of Navarre. The Emperor responded by declaring Francis deprived of Milan and formed an anti-French alliance with Pope Leo X (8 May 1521), who was interested in annexing the strategic territories of Parma and Piacenza, both part of French-held Milan. Thus, the Four Years' War began. Meanwhile, Cortés besieged (May 26) and occupied (August 13) Tenochtictlan, completing the conquest of the Aztec Empire. The ship carrying the main treasure of Emperor Cuauhtémoc was captured by the French corsair Jean Fleury, but 120,000 ducats' worth of bullion reached the Imperial treasury during the Italian conflict. Renaissance Italy was described by Mercurino di Gattinara as "the principal foundation of empire" and both Francis I and Charles V, who were considered the most powerful European monarchs of the time, aspired to primacy in the rich peninsula. As the Renaissance historian Francesco Guicciardini explained:

"If one of them [Charles V] ruled more kingdoms and states, the other [Francis I] deserved equal esteem, for his power was not scattered and divided in many places but concentrated in a united kingdom full of great wealth and with marvelous obedience of his people."

In September, Charles V closed the Diet of Worms in order to lead, for the first time in his life, a military campaign, commanding the Imperials against the invading forces of Francis I in the Low Countries. He successfully defended Flanders and won a battle at Tournai, while the Papal-Imperial army led by Prospero Colonna drove the French out of Milan, installed Francesco II Sforza to the ducal throne, and restored the provinces of Parma and Piacenza to the Papal States. Those successes were confirmed with the Battle of Bicocca a year later. Pope Leo X died in his Roman villa following a banquet held to celebrate the French defeat. He was replaced by Adrian of Utrecht, Charles's Flemish tutor and his regent in Spain, who went to Rome to be crowned as Pope Adrian VI. In 1522, Charles V decided to leave the Low Countries and sail for Spain, now without a regent and where revolts throughout the country continued along with the war in Navarre. He confirmed Margaret of Austria as governor of the Low Countries, naming her president of the Great Council and establishing a local inquisition to assist her in the research and destruction of Luther's books. For the regency and governorship of the Austrian lands, Charles secretly invested his brother Archduke Ferdinand with those territories: by the pacts of Worms (21 April 1521) and Brussels (7 February 1522), Ferdinand was appointed archduke of Austria in the name of Charles V. By the same treaties, Charles promised to support Ferdinand's candidacy as the designated successor in the Empire and to pass him hereditary rights over Austria at the Imperial succession.

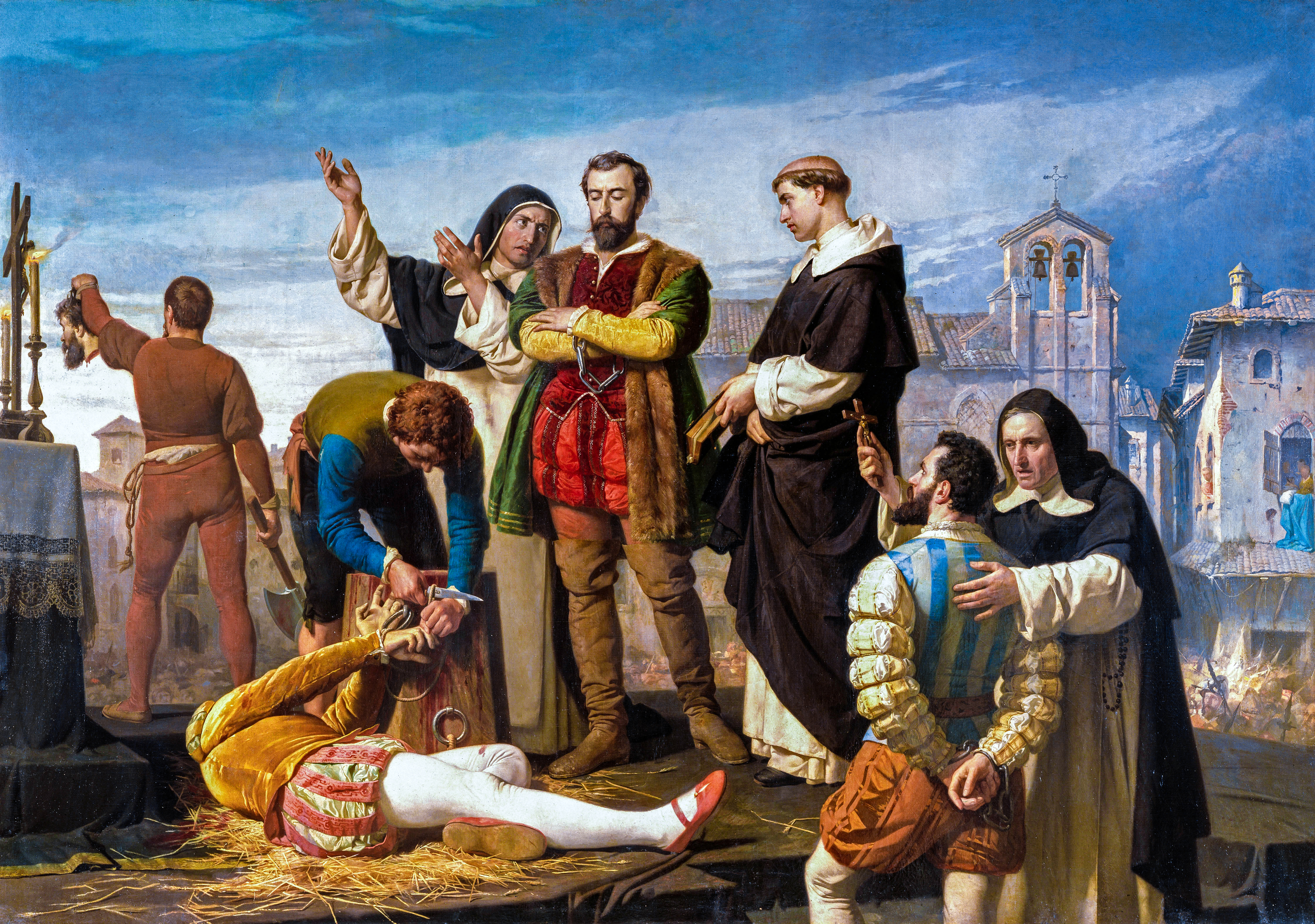
Execution of the comuneros Juan de Padilla, Juan Bravo and Francisco Maldonado.

During the voyage from the Low Countries to Spain, Charles V visited England. His aunt, Catherine of Aragon, convinced her husband, King Henry VIII, to ally himself with the Emperor. In 1522 and 1523, Charles V suppressed the Castilian and Aragonese revolts and ordered hundreds of executions until 1528. Military operations in Navarre ended in 1524, when the military leader Hondarribia surrendered to Charles's forces, although frequent cross-border skirmishes continued to occur for a number of years. In order to pacify Spain, the Emperor pardoned many rebels and honoured the agreements of 1517-1518 which chiefly consisted in appointing Castilians, rather than foreigners, for the high offices of Spain. Having already decided that his brother Ferdinand would succeed him in Austria and the Empire, Charles V also promised to celebrate his marriage in Spain and to give a Castilian heir to the Spanish throne. Thus, Spanish subjects were reconciled with Charles V. On the other hand, the price of reconciliation effectively consisted in accepting that a sizeable part of Spain's American resources was being used to sustain a foreign policy, that of the Holy Roman Empire, perceived to be in contrast to the country's interest by many Spaniards.

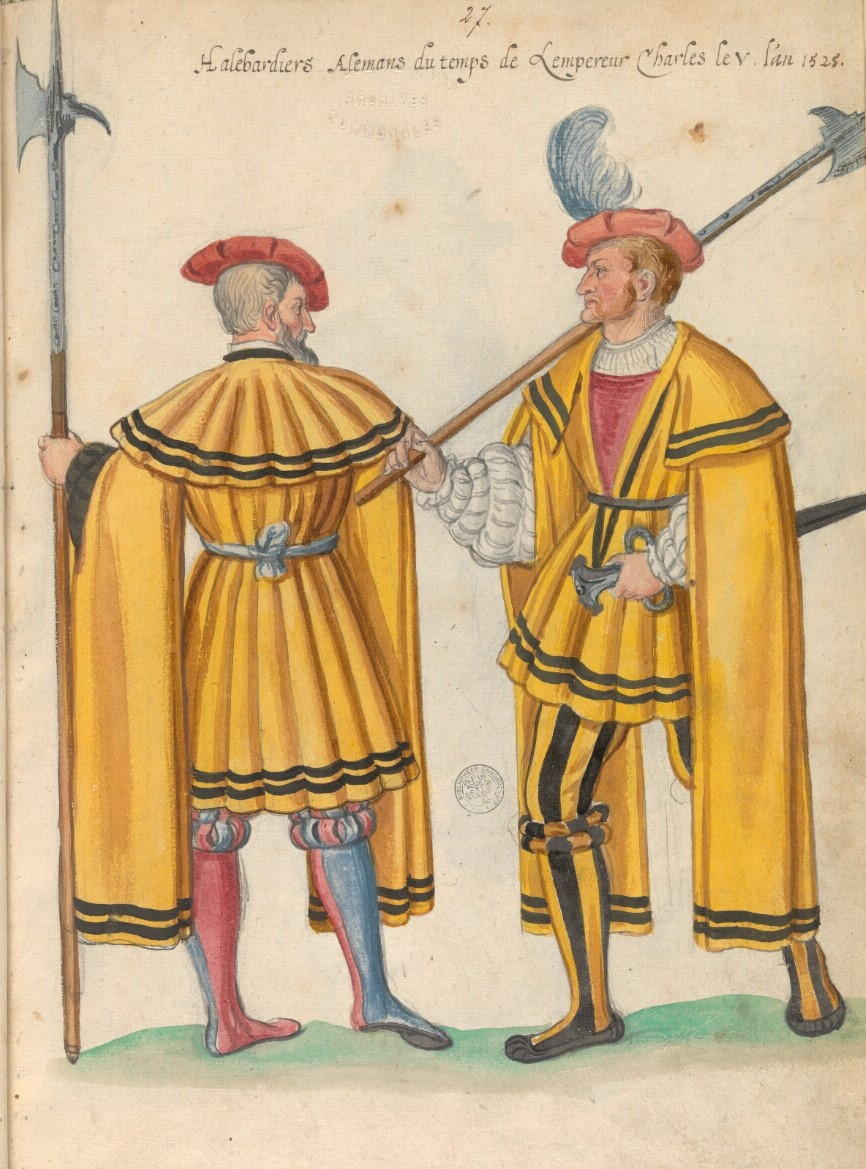
German soldiers of the time of the Battle of Pavia.

In Spain, Charles V reformed the administration following the Flemish conciliar system and created collateral councils, in addition to those established by Isabella of Castile and Ferdinand of Aragon, such as the Council of Finance (Consejo de Hacienda) in 1523, the Council of the Indies (Consejo de las Indias) in 1524, the Council of War (Consejo de Guerra) in 1526, and the Council of State (Consejo de Estado) in 1527. Similarly, Ferdinand was instructed to establish collateral councils in Austria such as the Privy Council (Geheimer Rat), the Aulic Council (Hofrat), the Court Chancellery (Hofkanzlei) and the Court Exchequer (Hofkammer). A regency council was also established in Germany, set up in the context of the imperial government, but proved ineffective in containing two major rebellions caused by the spread of Lutheranism: the Knights' War of 1522–1523 and the peasants' revolt led by Thomas Muntzer in 1524–1525. The pro-Imperial Swabian League, in conjunction with Lutheran princes afraid of social revolts, massacred tens of thousands of rebels. However, Charles V, being absent from Germany, was not directly involved in the massacres and, similarly to what he did in Spain, he used the instrument of pardon to restore order and subsequently initiated a policy of tolerance towards the Lutherans.

Taking advantage of the aforementioned revolts in Spain and Germany, Francis I of France retook the initiative in Italy and, in 1524, crossed into Lombardy where Milan, along with a number of other cities, once again fell to his attack. Ultimately, Pavia alone held out and was put under siege by the French king. At this point, the new Pope Clement VII of the House of Medici abandoned the alliance with the Emperor and endorsed Francis I. On 24 February 1525, Charles's twenty-fifth birthday, an Imperial army of pike and shot regiments, consisting primarily of 12,000 Germans (Landsknechts) and 5,000 Spaniards (Tercios), arrived in Lombardy and destroyed the French cavalry at the Battle of Pavia. The Burgundian-Fleming general Charles de Lannoy, Imperial lieutenant and Viceroy of Naples, captured Francis I and imprisoned him in the nearby tower of Pizzighettone. The four-year long war with France was effectively over.

=== League of Cognac ===
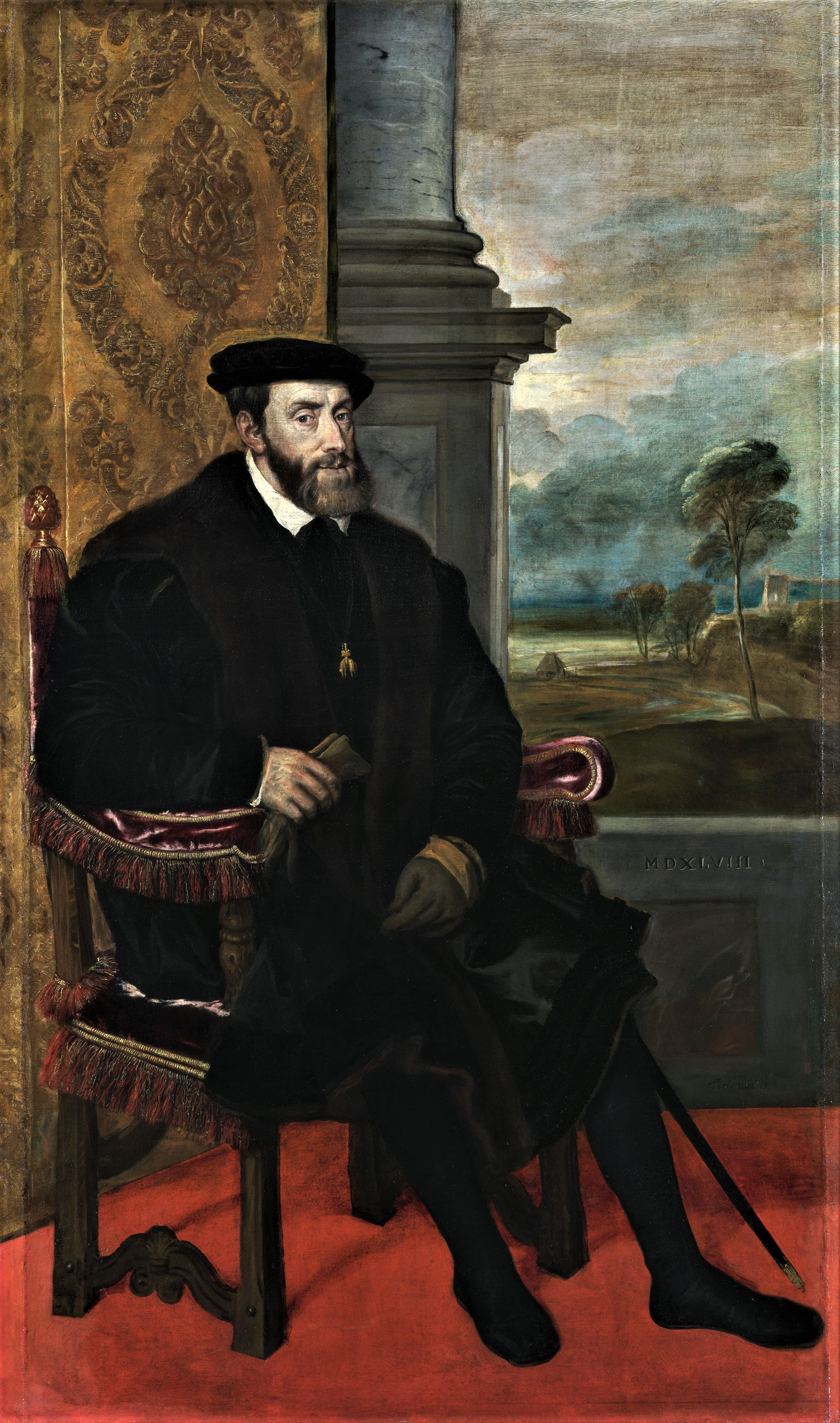
Portrait of Charles V by Titian.

Charles V and some of his principal counselors were informed of the victorious Battle of Pavia by Lannoy's couriers during a meeting of the Imperial court held at the Royal Alcazar of Madrid, where the Emperor was residing in preparation for his Spanish marriage with Isabella of Portugal. The Imperial court split in two factions: one, led by the grand-chancellor Gattinara, advocated for harsh conditions to be imposed on France; the other, led by Lannoy and his Flemish representatives with support from the German Henry III of Nassau-Breda (the favourite of Charles V) and the Spaniard Hugo of Moncada (who was captured and freed by the French during the war) advocated for the liberation of Francis I in exchange for the transfer of Burgundy proper to Charles V. The latter opinion reflected historic Flemish claims over Burgundy and it was the one ultimately endorsed by Charles V.

After signing the treaty of Rome with Clement VII, by which the House of Sforza was again restored to power in Milan and the Pope allied himself with Charles V for a second time, Lannoy brought the French king to the Alcazar in Spain. There, the French king and the Holy Roman Emperor agreed on the Treaty of Madrid (1526), whose content, according to the Renaissance historian Francesco Guicciardini, essentially reflected the proposal of Charles de Lannoy and Henry III of Nassau: Francis abandoned his claims over the Imperial Duchy of Milan and gave Burgundy to Charles V in exchange for his freedom. Gattinara refused to co-sign it. Many diplomats and political thinkers of the time strongly criticized Charles V for his decision to liberate the King of France. Notably, Niccolò Machiavelli called the Emperor a "fool" in private letters to his friends. Indeed, once liberated, Francis I had the Parlement of Paris denounce the treaty on the ground that it had been signed under duress and declared a new war on Charles V, whose management for the Imperials was again entrusted to Gattinara.

France then joined the League of Cognac, which was formed by Clement VII with the Venetians, the Florentines, and the Sforza, since the troops of Charles V had reacted to Francis' actions by taking direct possession of Milan. An Imperial army formed primarily by German landsknechts led by Georg Frundsberg and Charles III, Duke of Bourbon defeated the League's forces commanded by Giovanni dalle Bande Nere in Tuscany, causing the end of Medici rule in Florence and the restoration of a Florentine Republic, and marched on Rome. At this point, the Pope reversed his previous position and proclaimed himself an ally of the Emperor. However, with Frundsberg wounded in previous battles and the Duke of Bourbon killed (possibly by Benvenuto Cellini), many mercenaries of Lutheran faith mutinied and sacked Rome in 1527. Although Charles V did not order the sack and formally denied responsibility, the event shocked Catholic royals. Henry VIII of England blamed the Emperor and sided with Francis I of France. In 1528, looking for new resources, Charles V assigned a concession over Venezuela Province to the Welsers, a banking and patrician family of the Imperial cities of Augsburg and Nuremberg, in compensation for his inability to repay debts owed and with the goal of finding the legendary golden city of El Dorado. The German colony, known as Klein-Venedig (little Venice), inclusive of newly founded settlements such as Neu-Augsburg (later Coro) and Neu-Nuremberg (later Maracaibo), lasted until 1546.

In 1529, representatives of Pope Clement VII and Charles V signed the Treaty of Barcelona and thus restored the Papal-Imperial alliance. English support to France ceased. Francis I was now without allies and his Genoese admiral, Andrea Doria, joined Charles V. After Doria's private fleet escorted to Italy the Emperor, who left Isabella of Portugal as regent in Spain, Charles's aunt Margaret of Austria and Francis' mother Louise of Savoy agreed in 1529 to the Treaty of Cambrai (also called the "Ladies' Peace"). Francis I retained Burgundy proper, a better result for France compared to the agreements of 1526, but accepted defeat in the Italian peninsula and abandoned his claims over Imperial Italy.

=== Coronation in Bologna and Diet of Augsburg ===
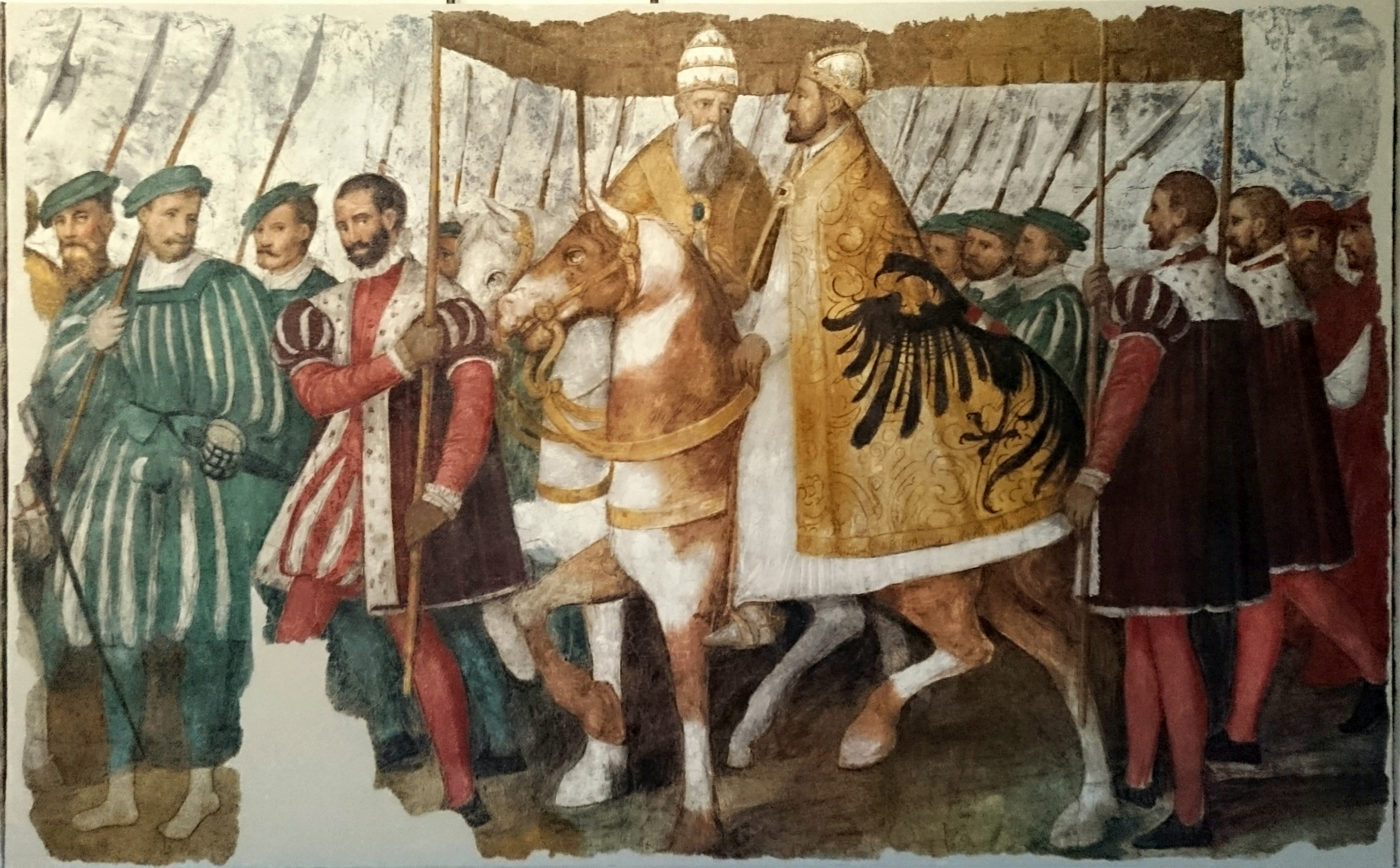
Pope Clement VII and Emperor Charles V on horseback under a canopy, by Jacopo Ligozzi, c. 1580. It describes the entry of the Pope and the Emperor into Bologna in 1530.

At the Congress of Bologna (1529-1530), Charles V gave several concessions to Clement VII: Francesco II of Sforza, an ally of the Pontiff, was again invested with the Duchy of Milan; the Catholic order of the Knights Hospitaller was entrusted with the government of Malta and Tripoli (Sicilian fiefs); the Papal House of Medici was restored to power in Florence by a Papal-Imperial army formed by 14,000 Italians, 8,000 Germans, and 6,000 Spaniards, all commanded by the Burgundian-Fleming general Philibert of Chalon and, following his death, by the Italian condottiero Ferrante Gonzaga. In exchange for the concessions received, Pope Clement VII crowned Charles V as King of Italy with the Iron crown and as Holy Roman Emperor with the Golden crown in the Basilica of San Petronio, Bologna. The two sovereigns rode under a single canopy followed by cardinals, Imperial soldiers, ambassadors of various states, and numerous princes: Boniface IV, Marquis of Montferrat carried the Imperial sceptre, Francesco Maria I della Rovere, Duke of Urbino the Imperial sword, and Charles III, Duke of Savoy, the crown itself. The figures of Constantine, Charlemagne, and Sigismund of Luxembourg were the examples set up in effigy for the Emperor to follow. The coronation of Bologna was the last Imperial coronation performed by a Pope.

In ten years, Charles V had successfully restored the power of the Holy Roman Empire to its medieval grandeur. Leaving Italy for Germany, the Emperor witnessed, in the Austrian city of Innsbruck, the death of Gattinara, the man largely responsible for the treaties of 1529 and for the coronation of 1530. At this point, Charles V became his own grand-chancellor and divided Gattinara's functions between two secretaries: Nicolas Perrenot de Granvelle, responsible for the Holy Roman Empire; and Francisco de los Cobos y Molina responsible for Spain and the Spanish possessions in the Americas and southern Italy. At the Diet of Augsburg (1530), the greatest Imperial assembly organized in Germany during the 16th century, Charles V recalled his recent success in pacifying Spain and Italy, rejected the Augsburg confession proposed by Luther's assistant Philip Melanchthon to recognize and regulate the Reformers' beliefs, and proclaimed his supreme authority in Christendom:

"We have been hearing about the dispute over Our holy Christian faith, which in Our absence has spread and rooted itself in many dangerous sects that give rise to no little confusion and schism in Our common German nation...And so, having issued several laws for keeping the subjects of Our Spanish kingdom united and peaceful during Our absence, and in view of Our special love for and inclination to the German Nation and the Holy Roman Empire… We were able, praise be to God, to restore peace and order to Italy… and now, As Roman emperor and supreme steward of Christendom, it pertains to Our Imperial office to confess Our obligation to guard, protect, and maintain the holy Christian faith as it has been preserved until now."

== Turkish threat ==
=== "The problem of two emperors" ===
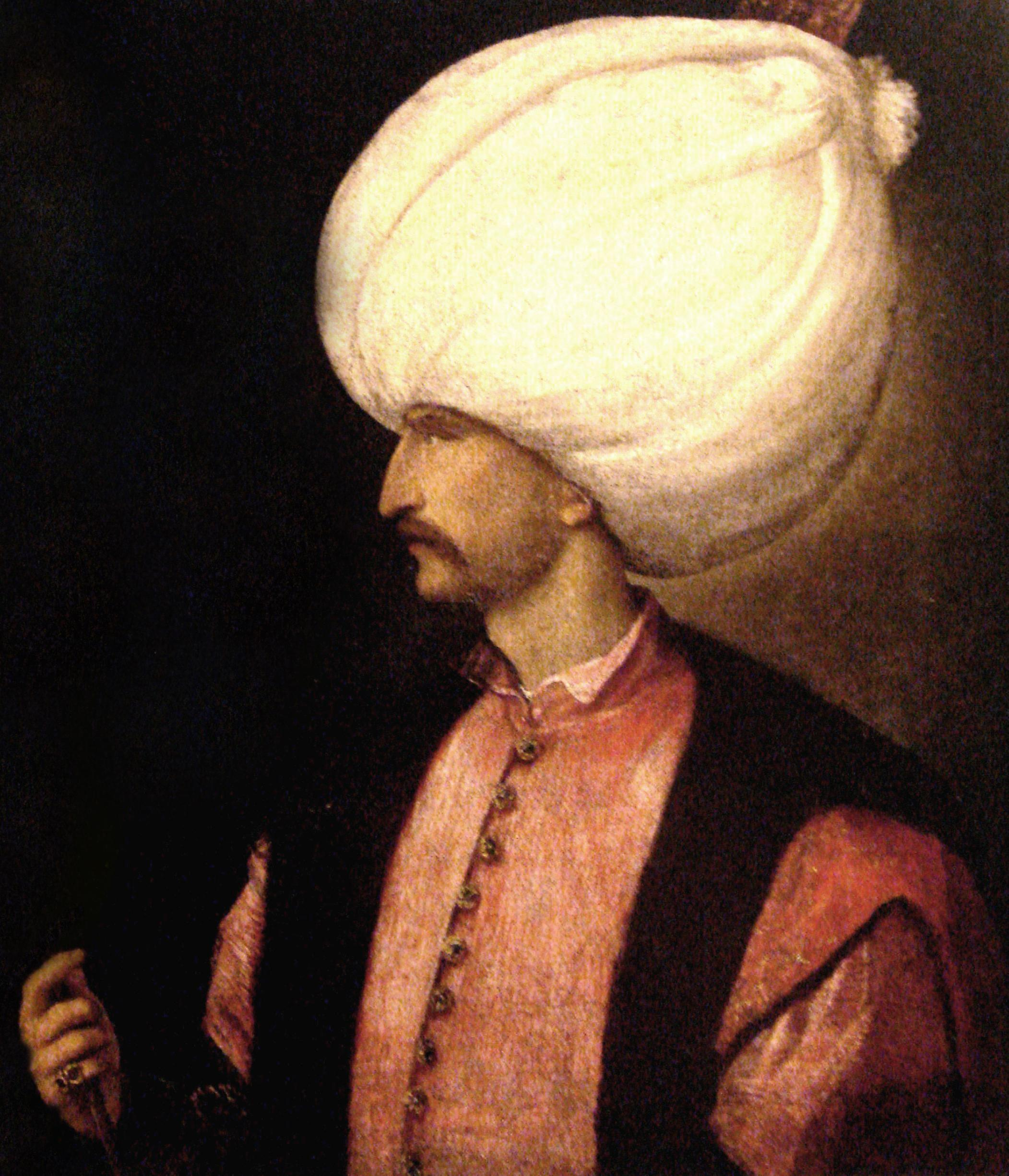
The Ottoman Sultan Suleiman the Magnificent.

The Ottoman Sultan Suleiman the Magnificent denied the global primacy of Charles V and wanted to affirm his own Imperial title as the supreme ruler of Islam. The problem of two emperors (Zweikaiserproblem) overlapped with the emerging Turkish threat (Turkengefahr): in 1526, Louis II, king of Hungary and Bohemia was defeated and killed at the Battle of Mohács by an army of Ottoman Turks; the event "sent a wave of terror over Europe". As the two elective thrones of Louis II were vacant, Charles V convinced the local nobles to elect his younger brother Ferdinand of Austria as king of Hungary and Bohemia in the Imperial name and under the Imperial protection.

Habsburg control of Bohemia was crucial for Charles V to retain a majority among the seven prince-electors, especially in times of political contrasts with the Lutherans. On the other hand, the position of Charles V and Ferdinand in Hungary was unstable. Only the northern part of the country was under Habsburg control; the southern part was occupied by the Ottoman Empire and, in the central portion of the former kingdom of Louis II, the Voivodeship of Transylvania of John Zápolya emerged as a buffer state. Thus, Hungary was a battleground between the Imperials and the Ottomans for most of Charles's reign. Initially, the Ottomans were even able to bring the conflict to Austria itself.

=== Siege of Vienna ===
The Turks besieged Vienna in 1529 and again in the following years, but the city, defended by Philip, Duke of Palatinate-Neuburg and Nicholas, Count of Salm, resisted and halted their advance. At the Diet of Augsburg in Germany (1530) the Ottoman advance was debated, but religious talks then prevented an immediate and collective counter-attack. The rejection of the Augsburg confession led in 1531 to the formation of the Schmalkaldic League by the now self-described Protestant princes. Despite this, Charles proved to have the majority of the prince-electors on his side as he had his brother Ferdinand elected King of the Romans, a title conferred to the future successor as Holy Roman Emperor, in Cologne (1531).

As the Turks temporarily suspended their operations, Charles focused on domestic affairs such as the approval of a penal code for all of Germany, known as the Constitutio Criminalis Carolina, and returned to the Low Countries in 1531. Margaret of Austria, who had died a year earlier, left the Burgundian Low Countries expanded to include Friesland (1524), Utrecht, and Overijssel (1528). The Emperor replaced her with his sister Mary of Hungary. To assist the new governor, Charles V created three collateral councils for the Low Countries (Privy Council, Council of Finances, and Council of State) and also promised: "i shall not forget you or my homeland, however far away I may be". Antwerp continued to flourish as a cosmopolitan center: in 1531, its bourse was opened "to the merchants of all nations".

Meanwhile, Suleiman began his third campaign to take Vienna in 1532, while the Turkish battle fleet headed for the Western Mediterranean. Charles V returned to Germany and, intending to avoid a religious conflict while in need of troops from all the German states to launch a campaign against the Ottomans, effectively suspended the Edict of Worms with the standstill of Nuremberg (1532). It was also agreed to postpone religious talks until the Pope called for an ecumenical council of the Catholic Church, to be held in Germany rather than Italy.

At the Diet of Regensburg (1532), Charles V raised an Imperial army of 12.000 Germans, 10.000 Spaniards, 10.000 Italians, and 4.000 Netherlanders. With the arrival of Protestant forces and additional troops, the Imperial army ultimately consisted of 120.000 infantry and 20.000 cavalry. Charles V, sharing the command of the army with Frederick II of the Palatinate, led the Imperial forces to Vienna, strengthening the fortifications of the city, and then crossed the Danube. Meanwhile, the Imperial navy commanded by Andrea Doria captured the Ottoman fortresses of Coron and Patras in Greece. Suleiman was forced to retreat and ended his campaign to take Vienna, where the Emperor made a triumphant return.

=== Tunisian campaign ===
The Emperor decided to continue his anti-Turkish struggle, with the goal of diverting Suleiman from launching other attacks against his possessions in central Europe and the Mediterranean. Informed of the capture of Inca Emperor Atahualpa by Francisco Pizarro at the Battle of Cajamarca (1532), Charles V ratified the beginning of the Spanish conquest of Peru and ordered the collection of resources for a Mediterranean enterprise in Ottoman Africa. Leaving Austria, he returned to Spain via Italy. A second Congress of Bologna (1533) between Clement VII and Charles V formally reconfirmed the pacts made in 1530 and denied Henry VIII of England a Papal dispensation to divorce from Catherine of Aragon, Charles's aunt, contributing to the English reformation.

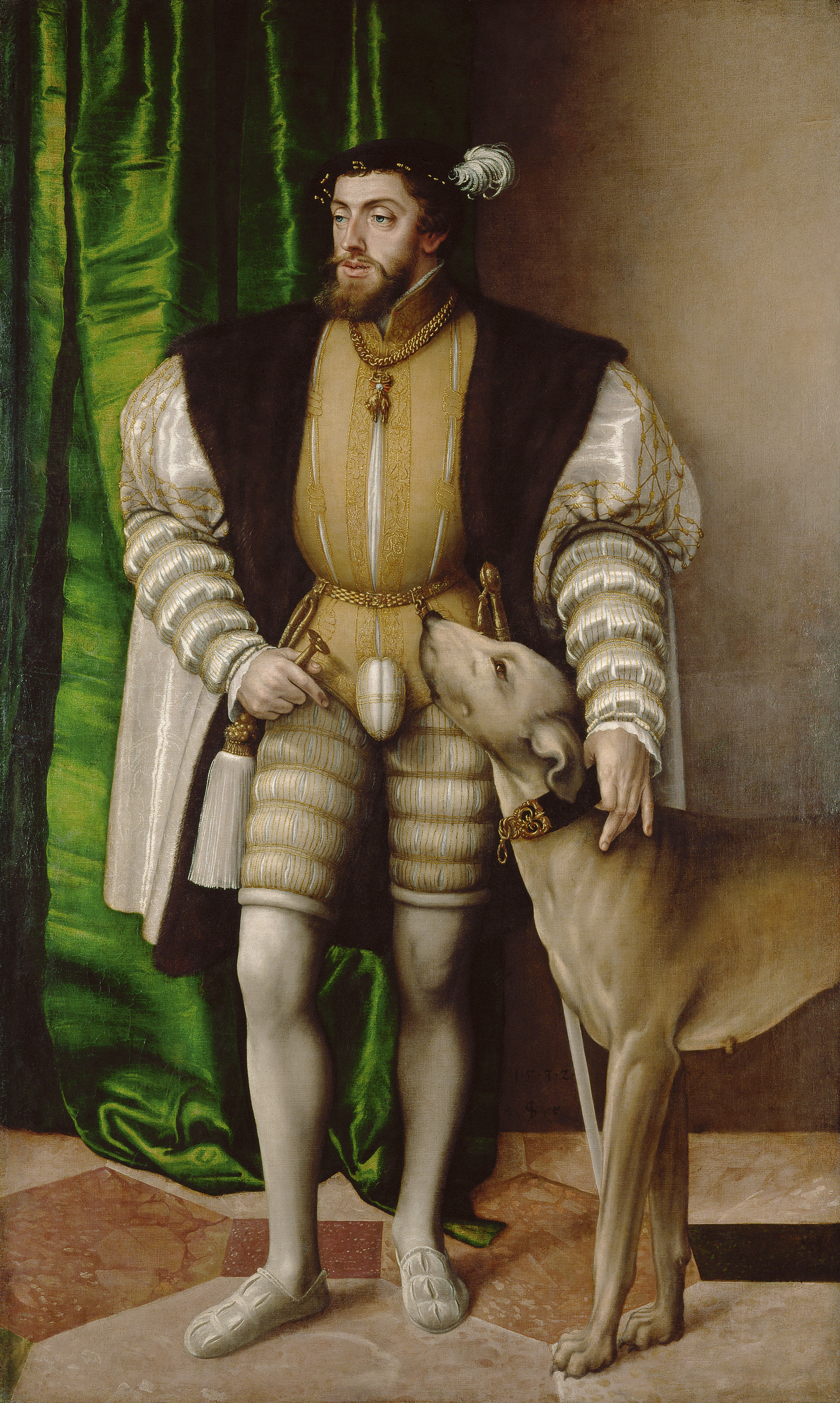
Portrait of Charles V by Jakob Seisenegger, 1533

However, Clement VII went to Marseille in order to sign an agreement with Francis I and celebrate the marriage of his niece Caterine de' Medici to Henry, Dauphin of France (the future Henry II of France). Luckily for Charles, the troublemaker Clement VII died shortly after. He was replaced (1534) by Pope Paul III, who opted to remain neutral in the rivalry between Charles V and Francis I, displeasing both monarchs, in order to facilitate a Catholic alliance against the Ottoman Turks and the Protestants (Lutherans in Germany and Calvinists in France). France refused to take part in the project, but Charles V responded favorably.

The feared Ottoman admiral Hayreddin Barbarossa was the main target of Charles V. Barbarossa's Muslim Barbary corsairs, acting under the general authority and supervision of the Sultan, regularly devastated the Spanish and Italian coasts, crippling trade between Habsburg dominions. In Barcelona, Charles V assembled an Imperial fleet carrying 10,000 Spaniards, 8,000 Germans, and 8,000 Italians. Sharing the command of the navy with Andrea Doria and of the landing forces with the Marquis of Vasto, the Emperor went to Sardinia, where he was joined by ships from Portugal, Malta, and the Papal States. From Sardinia, the Catholic coalition led by Charles V launched an attack on Tunis (1535), which served as the base of Barbary corsaires. The city was sacked and put under an Imperial puppet ruler of Islamic faith (Abu Abdallah Muhammad V al-Hasan) as a tributary state of the Spanish Kingdom of Sicily (an old tradition dating back to Frederick II, Holy Roman Emperor and King of Sicily), but Barbarossa and his men managed to escape to Algiers. Returning to Italy, Charles V appointed Ferrante Gonzaga as viceroy of Sicily with authority over a number of garrisons in Tunis and was celebrated as a new Scipio Africanus by the Sicilians.

== Franco-Ottoman alliance ==
=== Resumption of hostilities ===
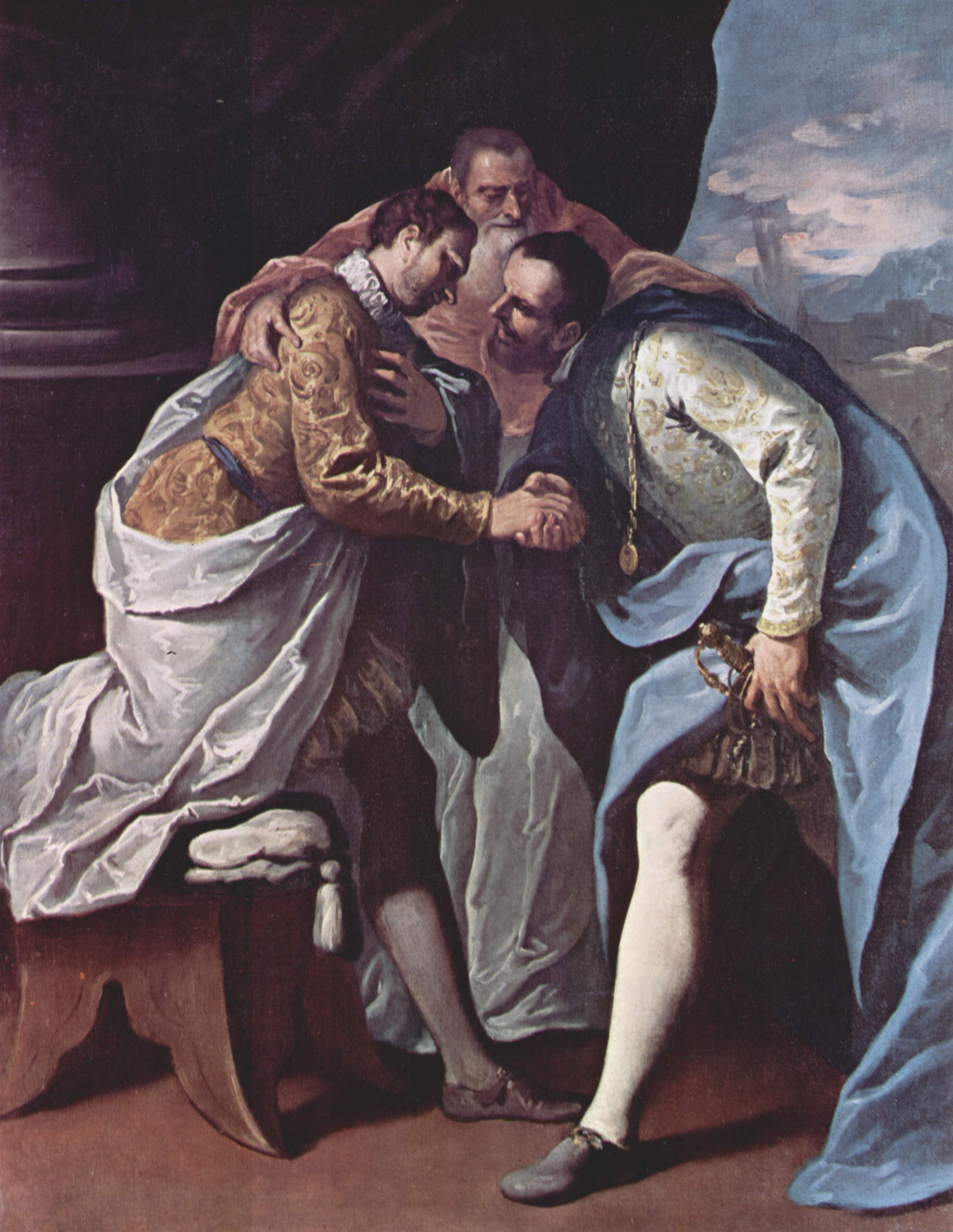
In 1538, Francis I and Charles V made peace in Nice with the mediation of Pope Paul III. Francis actually refused to meet Charles in person, and the treaty was signed in separate rooms.

As the last Sforza Duke died without heirs in 1535, Charles V incorporated the Imperial fief of Milan into his direct dominions. Francis I reacted in 1536 by occupying the Savoyard state, including Piedmont, and ignited a new phase of the Italian wars. Meanwhile, the Emperor made a triumphant entry in the ancient style to Rome to celebrate his victory in Tunis. At a meeting with Paul III, who declared his neutrality in the French-Imperial conflict, Charles V unsuccessfully tried to bring the Papal States on his side. On the other hand, a Franco-Ottoman alliance against the Emperor came into force.

Charles V thus made overtures to the Safavid Empire to open a second front against the Ottomans, in an attempt at creating a Habsburg-Persian alliance. Contacts were positive, but rendered difficult by enormous distances. In effect, the Safavids did enter in conflict with the Ottoman Empire in the Ottoman-Safavid war, forcing it to split its military resources. However, the Turks won the conflicts against Persia and retained their positions. Furthermore, a maritime Holy League under the command of Doria (formed by Charles's kingdoms and all the Italian states) was later defeated at the Battle of Preveza in 1538.

Intending to fight Francis I in French territory, and even inviting him to personal duel, Charles V led a military invasion of Provence in 1536–1537, which ended in complete failure. Paul III offered his mediation to the Emperor and Francis I, and the three rulers met in 1538 at the Congress of Nice, where a truce was agreed. Milan remained under Habsburg control, and the Savoyard state stayed in French hands.

=== A short-lived truce ===
The war of 1536-1538 was considered by many a major defeat for Charles V. At a meeting in Aigues-Mortes between the Emperor and the French king, Charles V agreed, for the future, to appoint a son of Francis I as Duke of Milan, a promise he was going to break. Indeed, Charles later secretly invested his own son Philip with the Duchy of Milan. Returning to Spain, the Emperor stayed with his wife Isabella, who fell ill and died in 1539. He was also informed of a revolt in his hometown of Ghent, where the heavy Imperial taxation was contested. He appointed his son Philip as regent in Spain and, after visiting Francis I in Paris, returned to the Low Countries, expanded in 1536 to include Groningen and Drenthe. Charles's army of German mercenaries, supported by the Spanish forces of Fernando Álvarez de Toledo, 3rd Duke of Alba, suppressed the insurrection in 1540. Charles humiliated the rebels by parading their leaders in undershirts with hangman nooses around their necks. The Emperor was ultimately convinced by Mary of Hungary to show clemency "out of respect to his countrymen" and relaxed the financial burden on the Low Countries.

Meanwhile, due to difficulties encountered by the Pope in organizing a general council to avoid a schism in the Church, the Emperor decided to summon a German religious meeting and presided over the Colloquy of Regensburg (1541) between Catholics and Lutherans. No compromise was achieved, largely due to the opposition of Pope Paul III who wanted a general council to take place in Italy. Charles V left Germany and was meeting with Paul III in the Italian city of Lucca, when he was informed of the Ottoman conquest of central Hungary, including Buda and Pest, following the death of Zapolya. Furious, he assembled in Genoa a fleet similar in size to the one that captured Tunis in 1535. From Palma de Majorca, he launched the long-awaited Algiers expedition (1541), the base of Barbarossa, but was forced to return to Minorca after a disastrous campaign.

=== Last war against Francis I ===
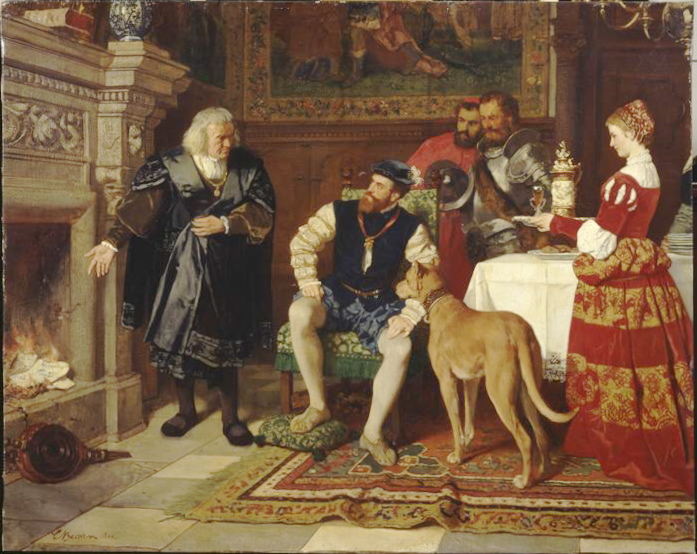
Charles V and Jakob Fugger in Augsburg.

In the aftermath of these events, two French ambassadors to Constantinople, Antonio Rincon and Cesare Fregoso, were killed by Charles's agents in Italy. A new French-Imperial war thus broke out in 1542. After passing the New Laws to reform the encomienda system, considered brutal by figures such as Bartolomé de las Casas, (a conference in Valladolid, inclusive of de Las Casas, was finally convened in 1550 to debate the morality on the use of force against the Indians) and leaving detailed instructions concerning the government of Spain to his son Philip, Charles V returned in 1543 to the Holy Roman Empire and remained there until the end of his reign. At a meeting in Busseto, he and Paul III agreed on Trent, located halfway between Italy and Germany, as the location of the future ecumenical council.

In alliance with Henry VIII of England, Charles V decided to invade France from Germany via the Low Countries, where William, Duke of Jülich-Cleves-Berg was forging an alliance with Francis I. This decision was also supported by the Protestants. At the Diet of Speyer in Germany, Charles V assembled an Imperial army formed by Catholics (German veterans, Spaniards, and Italians, all under the command of Ferrante Gonzaga) and Lutherans (under the command of Maurice of Saxony and the Margrave of Brandenburg) and marched in France, threatening Paris. Out of money, Charles V and Francis I signed the truce of Crépy-en-Laonnois (1544), which included the end of the Franco-Ottoman alliance and reconfirmed the previous peace. Meanwhile, the Emperor annexed Zutphen and Guelders to the Burgundian territories at the conclusion of the Guelders Wars. Duke William of Cleves ultimately surrendered to the Emperor his ambitions and claims over the Low Countries with the Treaty of Venlo.

However, the war with the Ottomans was compromised. Suleiman effectively emerged victorious in the contest for the Mediterranean and central Hungary. To gain himself some respite from the huge expenses of the Turkish wars, Charles was eventually forced to accept a truce in 1545, which became, two years later, the humiliating Treaty of Adrianople . On the other hand, the peace of Crépy allowed Charles V to concentrate his energies on the religious situation in Germany.

== Counter-Reformation and downfall ==
=== Schmalkaldic war ===
Equestrian Portrait of Charles V, painted in 1548 by Titian at the Imperial court of Augsburg to celebrate the Battle of Mühlberg.

In 1545, the long-awaited ecumenical council was opened by Pope Paul III in the city of Trent, located in Italy but close to Germany. This event, combined with the unification of the Low Countries, solemnly declared by the Emperor in Brussels, and with the discovery of the largest American silver mines in Potosí by the Spaniards, meant that Charles V was at the zenith of his power. The Emperor and the Catholic League of Nuremberg (formed in 1538) supported the Tridentine summit, but the Protestant Schmalkaldic League refused to recognize the council's validity, arguing that its location and composition were favorable to the Pope, and occupied certain territories of Catholic princes. At a Diet in Worms, the Protestant princes accused the Emperor of betrayal and even questioned his legitimacy to rule. Their propaganda now described him simply as "Charles of Ghent, so-called Emperor of Germany".

Charles V, "having resolved to remain at all costs Emperor of Germany", as he recalled in his autobiography, outlawed the Schmalkaldic League and opened hostilities against it in 1546 (the year of Luther's death). Papal troops under the command of Ottavio Farnese, sent by Paul III "to avenge the sack of Rome", joined the Emperor. The Catholic forces successfully defeated the League's troops. The Emperor, co-ordinating the German regiments of Maurice, Duke of Saxony and the Spanish forces of Fernando Álvarez de Toledo, 3rd Duke of Alba, ultimately captured the two leading Protestant princes, John Frederick, Elector of Saxony and Philip I of Hesse, at the Battle of Mühlberg (1547). Charles's decision to imprison them in Brussels exacerbated religious tensions, but effectively ended the civil war.

=== Aftermath ===
Meanwhile, the Papal-Imperial collaboration came to an end. Pope Paul III had created the Duchy of Parma and Piacenza, territories at the southern border of the Habsburg Duchy of Milan, and invested his son Pierluigi Farnese with the new state. Milan's new Imperial governor Ferrante Gonzaga resented the Papal decision and, with the approval of Charles V, ordered the assassination of Pierluigi Farnese and occupied Piacenza in 1547. Paul's grandson Ottavio Farnese returned to Italy and defended Parma as its new duke, while the Pope, in response to the Imperial actions, transferred the ecumenical council to Bologna, effectively suspending it. With the Augsburg Interim of 1548, the Emperor created a temporary solution by giving certain allowances to Protestants until a reconvened Council of Trent would restore unity. However, members of both sides resented the Interim and some actively opposed it.

The situation remained tense and Charles V, declining in health, further defined the future distribution of territories between his son Philip of Spain and his brother Ferdinand of Austria. In 1549, he issued a Pragmatic Sanction, declaring the Low Countries to be a unified entity of Seventeen Provinces of which his son Philip would be the heir. To celebrare the event, he and his son made a series of Joyous Entries in several Flemish cities. A year later, Charles V and Ferdinand, along with their sister Mary of Hungary, met at the Augsburg summit and agreed to the following succession plans for the Holy Roman Empire: Ferdinand would succeed Charles as already agreed, Philip would succeed Ferdinand, and Ferdinand's son Maximilian would succeed Philip. To maintain dynastic unity, inter-Habsburg marriages were to be arranged. However, Ferdinand ultimately convinced Philip to renounce his claim to the Imperial succession in favour of Maximilian.

=== Last battles ===
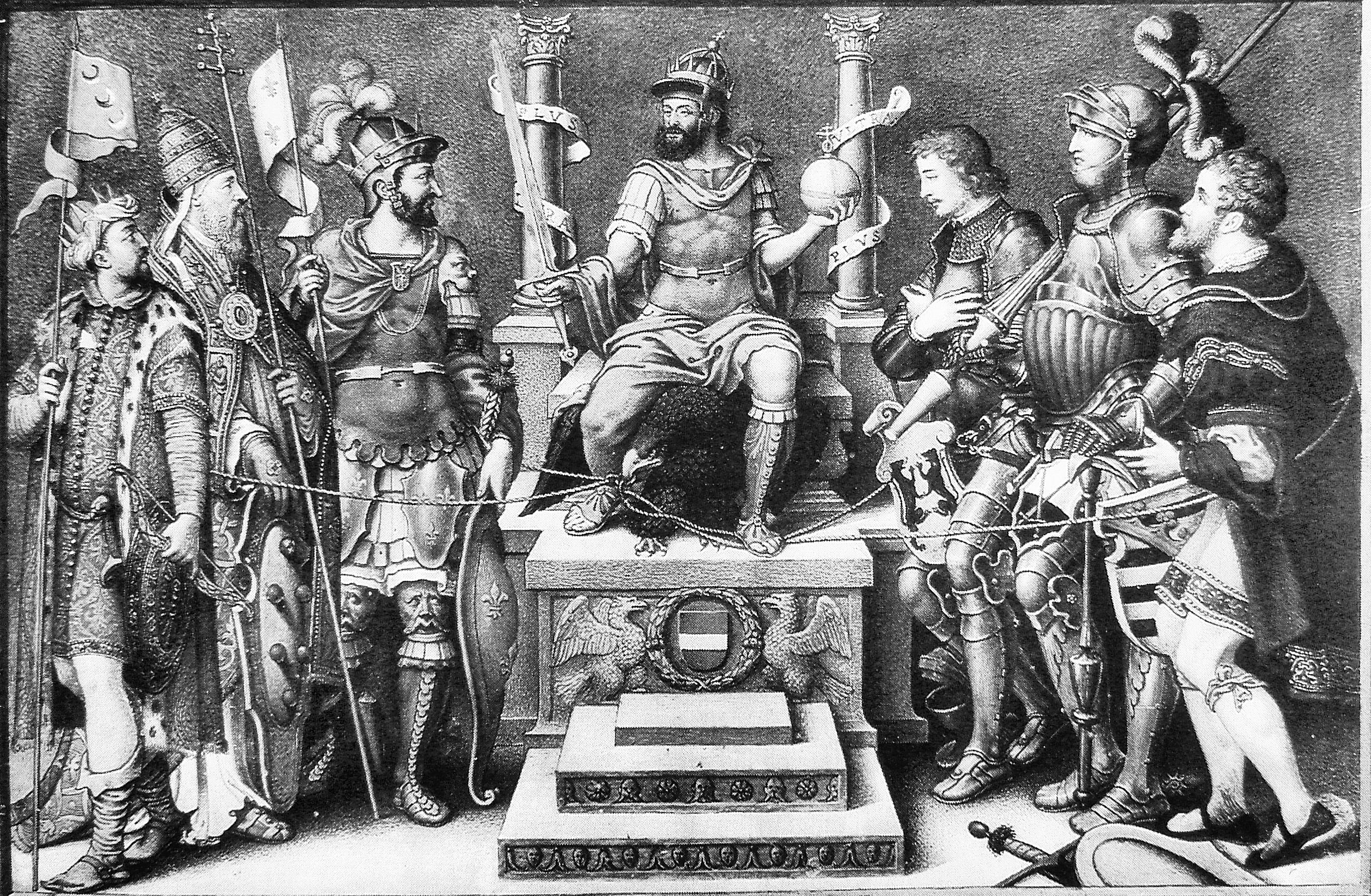
Charles V, enthroned over his enemies by Giulio Clovio. From left to right, Suleiman, Pope Clement VII, Francis I, William, Duke of Jülich-Cleves-Berg, John Frederick I, Elector of Saxony and Philip I, Landgrave of Hesse. In reality, Charles V was never able to completely defeat his opponents.

The Council of Trent was re-opened by the new Pope, Julius III, in 1550. This time the Lutherans were also represented. Charles V set up the Imperial court in Innsbruck, Tyrol, sufficiently close to Trent for him to follow the evolution of the debates. Meanwhile, the new French king Henry II established a new alliance with Suleiman the Magnificent. The Ottoman fleet captured Tripolitania from the Knights of Malta (Charles's vassals via the Kingdom of Sicily) and simultaneously launched a naval invasion of Corsica, forcing the Imperial admiral Doria to concentrate his forces on recovering the island for Genoa. Henry II also intervened in a new Italian war between the pro-imperial Duchy of Florence and the anti-imperial Republic of Siena, supporting the latter and prolonging the Republic's resistance for a number of years (although Siena was ultimately incorporated into Florentine territory).

By the Treaty of Chambord (1552), the Protestant princes called Henry II of France to occupy the Three Bishoprics (Metz, Verdun, and Toul) and to support them in a second rebellion against Charles V. Maurice of Saxony, instrumental for the Imperial victory in the first conflict, switched sides in favor of the Protestant cause. With a surprising attack, he marched directly into Innsbruck with the goal of capturing the Emperor. Charles V was forced to flee the city during an attack of gout and, carried in a litter, barely made it alive to Villach in a state of semi-consciousness. Subsequently, the Emperor agreed to the Peace of Passau and liberated the Protestant princes captured at Mühlberg. Assisted by the Spanish troops of the Duke of Alba and by the German regiments of the Margrave of Brandenburg, Charles V besieged French-held Metz but failed to recapture it from the forces led by Francis, Duke of Guise and François de Montmorency, 2nd Duke of Montmorency. Inflation was so high that the campaign of 1552 costed as much as the wars between 1521 and 1529. Charles then returned to the Low Countries for a last campaign against the French and for the remaining years of his emperorship. In 1555, he instructed his brother Ferdinand to sign the Peace of Augsburg in his name. The agreements recognized the religious division of Germany between Catholic and Protestant princedoms (Cuius regio, eius religio).

== Division of the empire ==
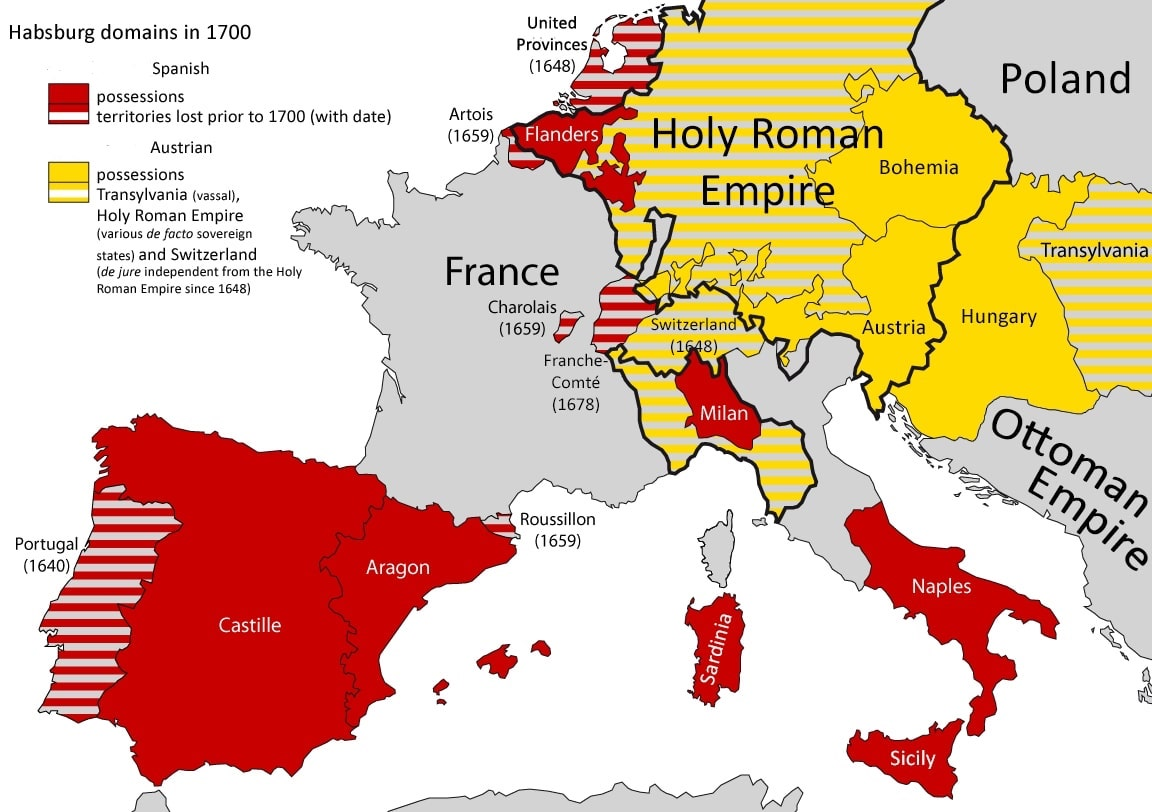
Habsburg dominions as partitioned by Charles V.

=== Abdications and retirement ===
Between 1554 and 1556, Charles V gradually divided the Habsburg empire between a Spanish line and a German-Austrian branch. His abdications occurred at the Palace of Coudenberg and are sometimes known as "Abdications of Brussels" (Abdankung von Brüssel in German and Abdicación de Bruselas in Spanish). First he abdicated the thrones of Sicily and Naples, the latter a fief of the Papacy, and the Imperial Duchy of Milan, in favour of his son Philip on 25 July 1554. Philip was secretly invested with Milan already in 1540 and again in 1546, but only in 1554 did the Emperor made it public. Upon the abdications of Naples and Sicily, Philip was invested by Pope Julius III with the Kingdom of Naples on 2 October and with the Kingdom of Sicily on 18 November.

The most famous—and only public—abdication took place a year later, on 25 October 1555, when Charles announced to the States General of the Netherlands (reunited in the great hall where he was emancipated exactly forty years earlier) his abdication in favour of his son of those territories as well as his intention to step down from all of his positions and retire to a monastery. During the ceremony, the gout-afflicted Emperor Charles V leaned on the shoulder of his advisor William the Silent and, crying, pronounced his resignation speech:

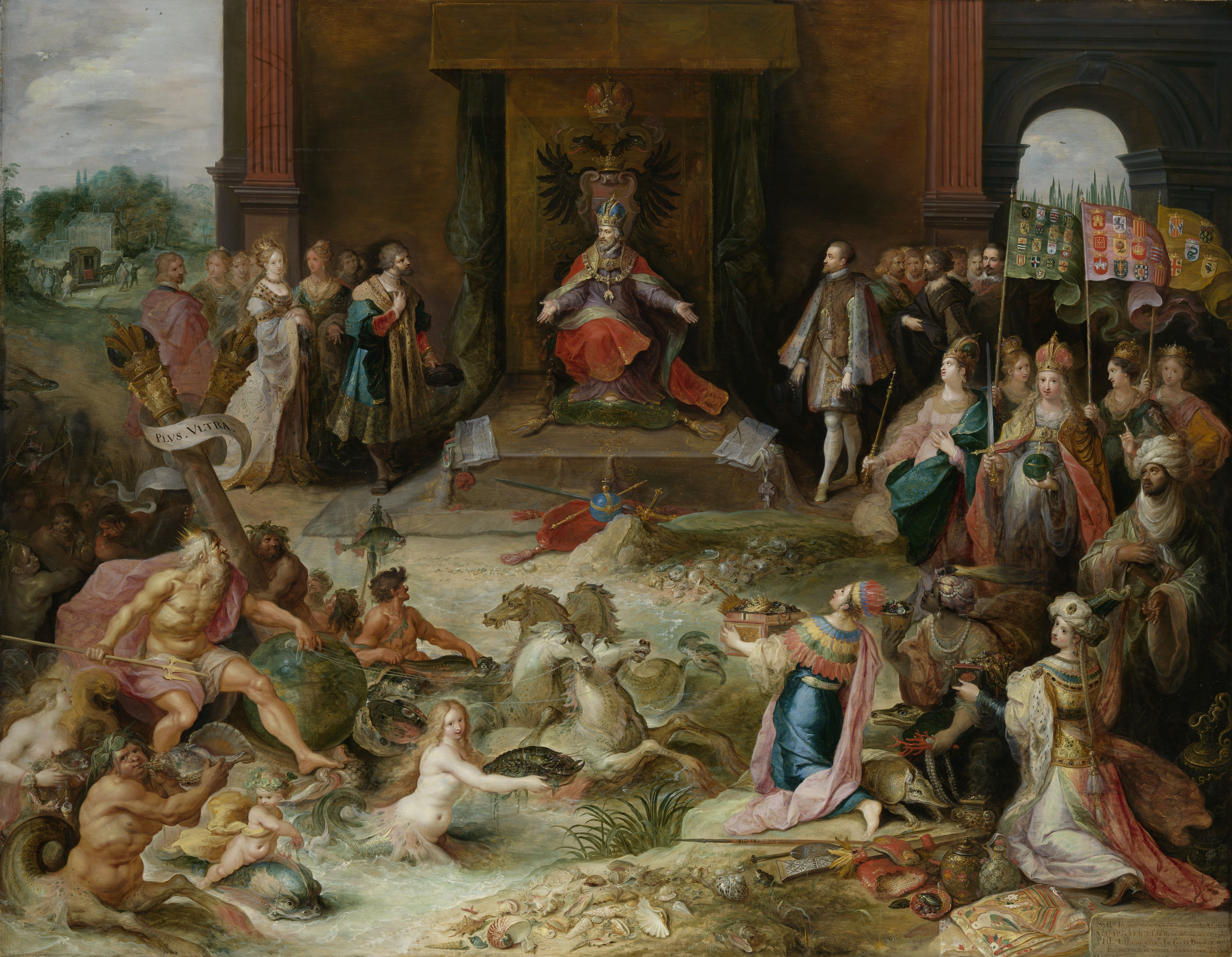
In Allegory on the abdication of Emperor Charles V in Brussels, Frans Francken the Younger depicts Charles V in the allegorical act of dividing the entire world between Philip II of Spain and Emperor Ferdinand I.

"When I was nineteen, upon my grandfather's death, I undertook to be a candidate for the Imperial crown, not to increase my possessions but rather to engage myself more vigorously in working for the welfare of Germany and my other realms…and in the hopes of thereby bringing peace among the Christian peoples and uniting their fighting forces for the defense of the Catholic faith against the Turks...I had almost reached my goal, when the attack by the French king and some German princes called me once more to arms. Against my enemies I accomplished what I could, but success in war lies in the hands of God, Who gives victory or takes it away, as He pleases…I must for my part confess that I have often misled myself, either from youthful inexperience, from the pride of mature years, or from some other weakness of human nature. I nonetheless declare to you that I never knowingly or willingly acted unjustly…If actions of this kind are nevertheless justly laid to my account, I formally assure you now that I did them unknowingly and against my own intention. I therefore beg those present today, whom I have offended in this respect, together with those who are absent, to forgive me.".

In 1556, with no fanfare, Charles V finalized his abdications. On 16 January 1556, he gave Spain and the Spanish Empire in the Americas to Philip. On 3 August 1556, he abdicated as Holy Roman Emperor in favour of his brother Ferdinand, elected King of the Romans in 1531. The succession was recognized by the prince-electors assembled at Frankfurt only in 1558, and by the Pope only in 1559. The Imperial abdication also marked the beginning of Ferdinand's legal and suo jure rule in the Austrian possessions, that he governed in Charles's name since 1521–1522 and were attached to Hungary and Bohemia since 1526. According to scholars, Charles decided to abdicate for a variety of reasons: the religious division of Germany sanctioned in 1555; the state of Spanish finances, bankrupted by inflation at the end of his reign; the revival of Italian Wars with attacks from Henry II of France; the never-ending advance of the Ottomans in the Mediterranean and central Europe; and his declining health, in particular attacks of gout such as the one that forced him to postpone an attempt to recapture the city of Metz where he was later defeated.

In September 1556, Charles left the Low Countries and sailed to Spain accompanied by Mary of Hungary and Eleanor of Austria. He arrived to the Monastery of Yuste of Extremadura in 1557. He continued to correspond widely and kept an interest in the situation of the empire, while suffering from severe gout. He lived alone in a secluded monastery, surrounded by paintings of Titian and with clocks lining every wall, which some historians believe were symbols of his reign and his lack of time. In an act designed to "merit the favour of heaven", about six months before his death Charles staged his own funeral, complete with shroud and coffin, after which he "rose out of the coffin, and withdrew to his apartment, full of those awful sentiments, which such a singular solemnity was calculated to inspire." In August 1558, Charles was taken seriously ill with what was later revealed to be malaria. He died in the early hours of the morning on 21 September 1558, at the age of 58, holding in his hand the cross that his wife Isabella had been holding when she died.

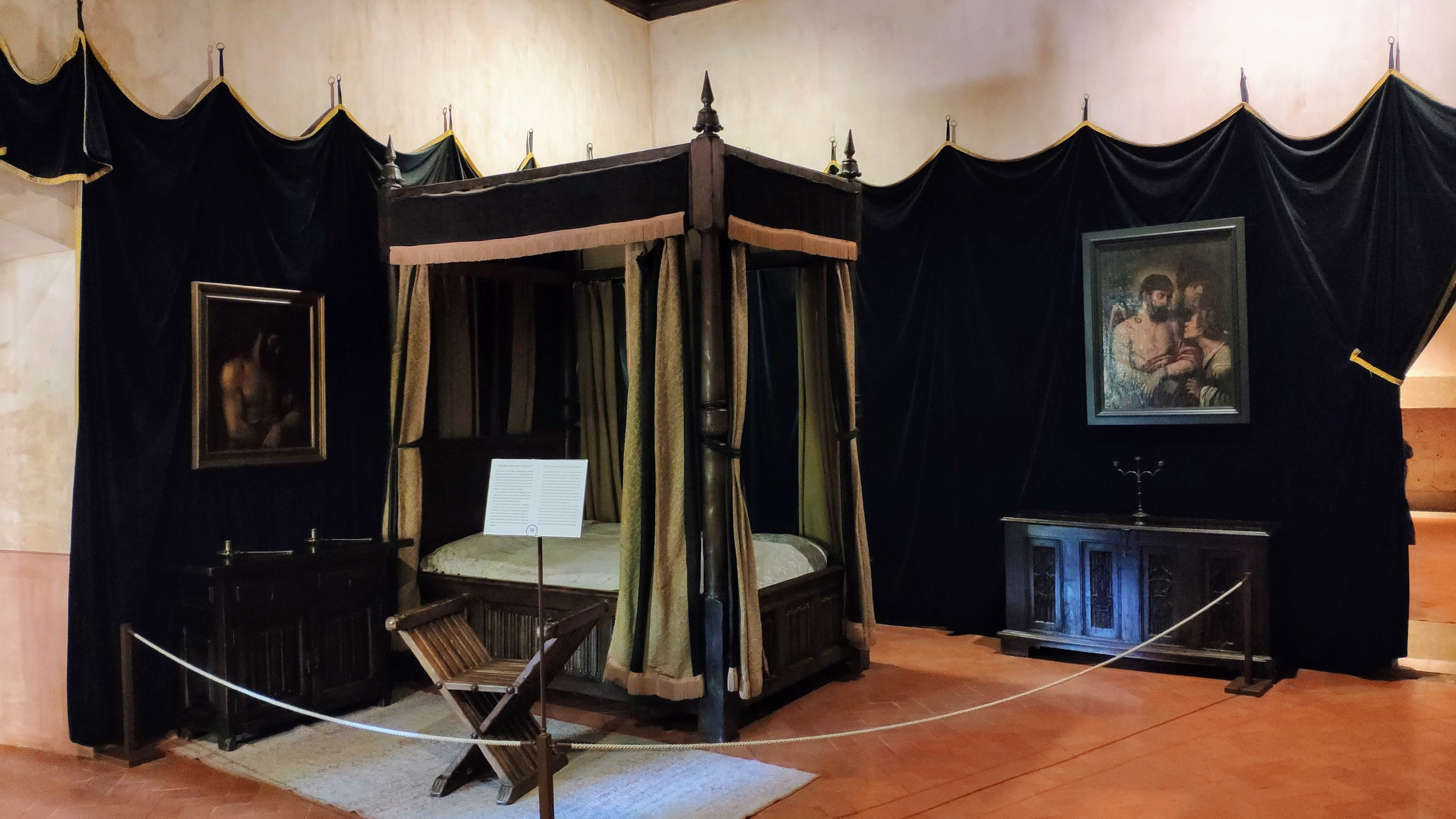
Deathbed of the emperor at the Monastery of Yuste, Cáceres

=== Legacy ===
In his last public speech, Charles V described his life as "one long journey" and recalled that he travelled ten times to the Low Countries, nine to Germany, seven to Spain, seven to Italy, four to France, two to England, and two to North Africa. During all his travels, the Emperor left a documentary trail in almost every place he went, allowing historians to surmise that he spent 10,000 days in the Low Countries, 6,500 days in Spain, 3,000 days in Germany, and 1,000 days in Italy. He further spent 195 days in France, 99 in North Africa and 44 days in England. For only 260 days his exact location is unrecorded, all of them being days spent at sea travelling between his dominions.

Karl Brandi famously wrote that the Imperial abdications proved that Charles V, along with the medieval concept of world monarchy, "belonged to an age now dead". Charles V could not prevent the religious division of Germany nor overcome French hostility. The price revolution, which he effectively fueled by ordering a massive influx of American silver to sustain the Imperial foreign policy, left Spain crippled by inflation and ultimately bankrupted. All these factors effectively prevented the unity of Christendom against the Ottoman Turks, another Imperial goal. Yet, despite Charles's personal and ideological failure, the House of Habsburg increased its territories during his reign and remained a powerful force afterwards: the Spanish branch would continue to rule its global empire until it went extinct in 1700 and the Austrian branch, extinct in the male line in 1740, would continue to retain some form of the Imperial title until the downfall of the Habsburg empire in 1918.

== See also ==
- Charles V, Holy Roman Emperor
- Portrait of Charles V (Titian, Munich)
- Equestrian Portrait of Charles V
- Coronation of Charles V
- Coat of arms of Charles V, Holy Roman Emperor

== General sources ==
- Atkins, Sinclair. "Charles V and the Turks", History Today (Dec 1980) 30#12 pp 13–18
- Blockmans, W. P., and Nicolette Mout. The World of Emperor Charles V (2005)
- Brandi, Karl. The emperor Charles V: The growth and destiny of a man and of a world-empire (1939) online
- Espinosa, Aurelio. "The Grand Strategy of Charles V (1500–1558): Castile, War, and Dynastic Priority in the Mediterranean", Journal of Early Modern History (2005) 9#3 pp 239–283. online
- Espinosa, Aurelio. "The Spanish Reformation: Institutional Reform, Taxation, and the Secularization of Ecclesiastical Properties under Charles V", Sixteenth Century Journal (2006) 37#1 pp 3–24. JSTOR 20477694.
- Espinosa, Aurelio. The Empire of the Cities: Emperor Charles V, the Comunero Revolt, and the Transformation of the Spanish System (2008)
- Ferer, Mary Tiffany. Music and Ceremony at the Court of Charles V: The Capilla Flamenca and the Art of Political Promotion (Boydell & Brewer, 2012). ISBN 978-1843836995
- Fletcher, Catherine (2016). The Black Prince of Florence: The Spectacular Life and Treacherous World of Alessandro de' Medici. Oxford University Press.
- Froude, James Anthony (1891). The Divorce of Catherine of Aragon. Kessinger, reprint 2005. ISBN 1417971096.
- Headley, John M. Emperor & His Chancellor: A Study of the Imperial Chancellery under Gattinara (1983) covers 1518 to 1530.
- Heath, Richard. Charles V: Duty and Dynasty. The Emperor and his Changing World 1500–1558. (2018) ISBN 978-1725852785
- Holmes, David L. (1993). A Brief History of the Episcopal Church. Continuum International Publishing Group. ISBN 1563380609.
- Kamen, Henry (1997). Philip of Spain. New Haven: Yale University Press. ISBN 978-0-300-07081-1.
- Kleinschmidt, Harald. Charles V: The World Emperor ISBN 978-0750924047
- Merriman, Roger Bigelow. The rise of the Spanish empire in the Old world and the New: Volume 3 The Emperor (1925) online
- Norwich, John Julius. Four Princes: Henry VIII, Francis I, Charles V, Suleiman the Magnificent and the Obsessions that Forged Modern Europe (2017), popular history; excerpt
- Parker, Geoffrey. Emperor: A New Life of Charles V (2019) excerpt
- Reston Jr, James. Defenders of the Faith: Charles V, Suleyman the Magnificent, and the Battle for Europe, 1520–1536 (2009), popular history.
- Richardson, Glenn. Renaissance Monarchy: The Reigns of Henry VIII, Francis I & Charles V (2002) 246 pp. covers 1497 to 1558.
- Rodriguez-Salgado, Mia. Changing Face of Empire: Charles V, Philip II & Habsburg Authority, 1551–1559 (1988), 375pp.
- Rosenthal, Earl E. Palace of Charles V in Granada (1986) 383pp.
- Saint-Saëns, Alain, ed. Young Charles V. (New Orleans: University Press of the South, 2000).
- Tracy, James D. Emperor Charles V, impresario of war: campaign strategy, international finance, and domestic politics (Cambridge UP, 2002). excerpt
- Salvatore Agati (2009). Carlo V e la Sicilia. Tra guerre, rivolte, fede e ragion di Stato, Giuseppe Maimone Editore, Catania 2009, ISBN 978-88-7751-287-1 (in Italian)
- D'Amico, Juan Carlos. Charles Quint, Maître du Monde: Entre Mythe et Realite 2004, 290p. (in French)
- Norbert Conrads: Die Abdankung Kaiser Karls V. Abschiedsvorlesung, Universität Stuttgart, 2003 (text Archived 17 July 2011 at the Wayback Machine) (in German)
- Stephan Diller, Joachim Andraschke, Martin Brecht: Kaiser Karl V. und seine Zeit. Ausstellungskatalog. Universitäts-Verlag, Bamberg 2000, ISBN 3-933463-06-8 (in German)
- Alfred Kohler: Karl V. 1500–1558. Eine Biographie. C. H. Beck, München 2001, ISBN 3-406-45359-7 (in German)
- Alfred Kohler: Quellen zur Geschichte Karls V. Wissenschaftliche Buchgesellschaft, Darmstadt 1990, ISBN 3-534-04820-2 (in German)
- Alfred Kohler, Barbara Haider. Christine Ortner (Hrsg): Karl V. 1500–1558. Neue Perspektiven seiner Herrschaft in Europa und Übersee. Verlag der Österreichischen Akademie der Wissenschaften, Wien 2002, ISBN 3-7001-3054-6 (in German)
- Ernst Schulin: Kaiser Karl V. Geschichte eines übergroßen Wirkungsbereichs. Kohlhammer Verlag, Stuttgart 1999, ISBN 3-17-015695-0 (in German)
- Ferdinant Seibt: Karl V. Goldmann, München 1999, ISBN 3-442-75511-5 (in German)
- Manuel Fernández Álvarez: Imperator mundi: Karl V. – Kaiser des Heiligen Römischen Reiches Deutscher Nation.. Stuttgart 1977, ISBN 3-7630-1178-1 (in German)
