= Treaty of Speyer =

The term Treaty of Speyer or Treaty of Spires refers to any of several treaties signed in the city of Speyer (Spires), now in Germany:

- Treaty of Speyer (1209)
- Treaty of Speyer (1544), or the Peace of Speyer
- Treaty of Speyer (1570)

== See also ==
- Diet of Speyer
- Protestation at Speyer
