= Diet of Speyer =

Diet of Speyer or Diet of Spires refers to any of the sessions of the imperial diets of the Holy Roman Empire, of which 50 took place between 838 and 1570 in the city of Speyer (Spires), now in Germany. The most famous sessions occurred in 1526 and 1529.

An incomplete lists of Diets of Speyer includes:

- Diet of Speyer (838)
- Diet of Speyer (1126)
- Diet of Speyer (1146)-Bernard of Clairvaux convinces Holy Roman Emperor Conrad III and many nobles to join 2nd crusade
- Diet of Speyer (1178)
- Diet of Speyer (1193)
- Diet of Speyer (1205)
- Diet of Speyer (1213)
- Diet of Speyer (1273)
- Diet of Speyer (1309)
- Diet of Speyer (1384)
- Diet of Speyer (1414)
- Diet of Speyer (1444)
- Diet of Speyer (1487)
- Diet of Speyer (1526) (Speyer I)
- Diet of Speyer (1529) (Speyer II)
- Diet of Speyer (1542)
- Diet of Speyer (1544)
- Diet of Speyer (1570) (Speyer V)

== See also ==
- Treaty of Speyer (disambiguation)
- Protestation at Speyer
