= Burgundian Circle =

Imperial circle of the Holy Roman Empire

Burgundian Circle Burgundischer Kreis
- Imperial circle of the Holy Roman Empire
- 1512–1797
- The Burgundian Circle after 1548 within the Holy Roman Empire
- Historical era: Early modern period
  - Established: 1512
  - Secession of the Seven United Provinces: 1648
  - Disestablished: 1797
- Today part of: Belgium; France; Germany; Luxembourg; Netherlands

The Burgundian Circle (German: Burgundischer Kreis, Dutch: Bourgondische Kreits, French: Cercle de Bourgogne) was an imperial circle of the Holy Roman Empire created in 1512 and significantly enlarged in 1548. In addition to the Free County of Burgundy (the region of Franche-Comté), the Burgundian Circle roughly covered the Low Countries, i.e., the areas now known as the Netherlands, Belgium and Luxembourg and adjacent parts in the French administrative region of Nord-Pas-de-Calais. For most of its history, its lands were coterminous with the Habsburg Netherlands and the Burgundian Free County (Franche-Comté).

The circle's territorial scope was reduced considerably in the 17th century with the secession of the Seven United Provinces in 1581 (recognized 1648 under the Treaty of Westphalia) and the annexation of the Free County of Burgundy by France in 1678. Consequently, in the 18th century the circle was known as Austrian Netherlands as the Austrian Habsburgs had obtained the territory from Spain earlier in that century. The occupation and subsequent annexation of Imperial territory to the west of the Rhine river by Revolutionary France in the 1790s effectively brought an end to the circle's existence.

== Composition ==
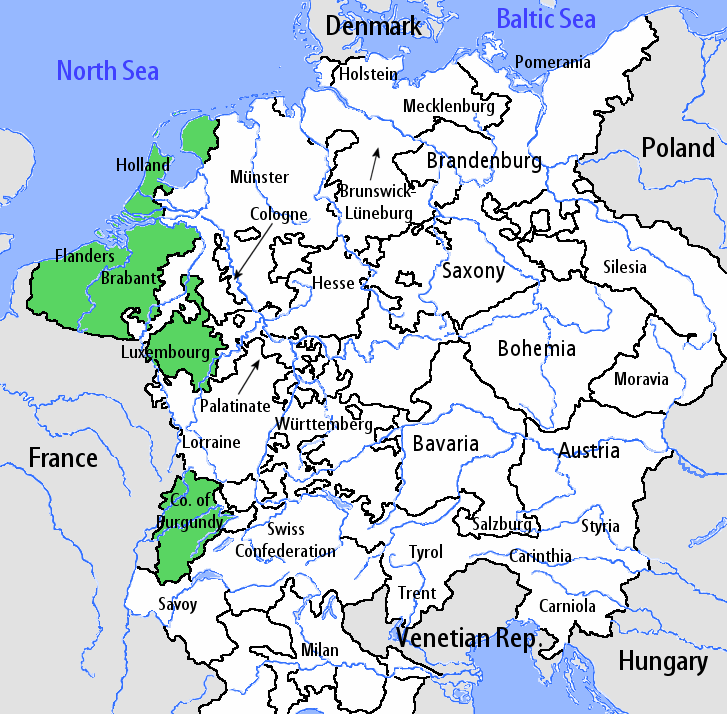
Burgundian Circle (green) in 1512

History of the Low Countries (schematic)
Frisii		Germanic tribes		Belgae & Celts			
Frisii	Cana– nefates (Note: Roman foederati)	Chamavi, Tubantes (Note: The Chamavi merged into the confederation of the Franks; the Tubantes merged into the confederation of the Saxons.)		Gallia Belgica (55 BC–c. 5th century AD); Germania Inferior (83–c. 5th century)			
Frisii	Cana– nefates	Salian Franks		Batavi			
unpopulated (4th –c. 5th centuries)		Saxons	Salian Franks (4th–c. 5th centuries)				
Frisian Kingdom (c. 6th century – 734)		Saxons	Frankish Kingdom (481–843)—Carolingian Empire (800–843)				
Frisian Kingdom (c. 6th century – 734)		Austrasia (511–687)					
Middle Francia (843–855)				West; Francia (from 843)	Middle Francia (843–855)		
Kingdom of Lotharingia (Note: Part of East Francia after 939, divided in Upper Lorraine (as part of West Francia) and Lower Lorraine (as part of East Francia) in 959.) (855–959); Duchy of Lower Lorraine (Note: Lower Lorraine—also referred to as Lothier—disintegrated into several smaller independent territories and only the title of a "Duke of Lothier" remained, held by Brabant.) (from 959)			Kingdom of Lotharingia (855–959); Duchy of Lower Lorraine (from 959)	West; Francia (from 843)	Kingdom of Lotharingia (855–959); Duchy of Lower Lorraine (from 959)		
Frisia			Kingdom of Lotharingia (855–959); Duchy of Lower Lorraine (from 959)	County of Flanders (Note: Including County of Artois (part of Flanders until 1237) and Tournaisis.) (862–1384)	Kingdom of Lotharingia (855–959); Duchy of Lower Lorraine (from 959)		
Frisian; Freedom (Note: Lordship of Frisia and Lordship of Groningen (including the Ommelanden) after 1524 and 1536 respectively.) (11th–16th centuries)	County of Holland (Note: Including County of Zeeland, that was ruled by neighboring County of Holland and County of Flanders (until 1432).) (880–1432)	Bishopric of Utrecht (Note: Utrecht included Lordship of Overijssel (until 1528), County of Drenthe (until 1528) and County of Zutphen (until 1182).) (695–1456)	Duchy of Brabant (Note: Duchy of Brabant included since 1288 also the Duchy of Limburg (now part of Belgium's Liège Province) and the "Overmaas" lands Dalhem, Valkenburg and Herzogenrath (now part of the Dutch Province of Limburg).) (1183–1430) Duchy of Guelders (Note: The county, later duchy, of Guelders consisted of four quarters, as they were separated by rivers: situated upstream Upper Quarter (the present day northern half of the Dutch province of Limburg), spatially separated from the three downstream Lower Quarters: County of Zutphen (after 1182), Veluwe Quarter and Nijmegen Quarter. The three lower quarters emerged from the historic gau Hamaland (named after the Chamavi tribe), and formed the present day province of Gelderland. Guelders did not include the Cleves enclave Huissen and the independent counties of Buren and Culemborg, that were much later seceded to the province of Gelderland.) (1046–1543)	County of Flanders (862–1384)	County of Hainaut (1071–1432) County of Namur (981–1421)	Prince- Bishopric of Liège (Note: Throughout the Middle Ages, the bishopric was further expanded with the Duchy of Bouillon in 1096 (ceded to France in 1678), the acquisition of the county of Loon in 1366 and the county of Horne in 1568. The Lordship of Mechelen was also part of the Prince-Bishopric of Liège.)(980–1791)	Duchy of Luxembourg (1059–1443)
Frisian; Freedom (11th–16th centuries)	Burgundian Netherlands (1384–1482)					Prince- Bishopric of Liège (980–1791)	Burgundian Netherlands (1384–1482)
Habsburg Netherlands (1482–1795) (Seventeen Provinces after 1543) (Note: The name Seventeen Provinces came in use after the Habsburg emperor Charles V had re-acquired the Duchy of Guelders, and an continuous territory arose.)						Prince- Bishopric of Liège (980–1791)	Habsburg Netherlands (1482–1795) (Seventeen Provinces after 1543)
Dutch Republic (1581–1795)				Spanish Netherlands (1556–1714)		Prince- Bishopric of Liège (980–1791)	Spanish Netherlands (1556–1714)
Dutch Republic (1581–1795)				Austrian Netherlands (1714–1795)		Prince- Bishopric of Liège (980–1791)	Austrian Netherlands (1714–1795)
Dutch Republic (1581–1795)				United States of Belgium (1790)		Republic of Liège (1789–'91)	United States of Belgium (1790)
Dutch Republic (1581–1795)				Austrian Netherlands (1795–1797)		P.-Bish. of Liège (1791–1794)	Austrian Netherlands (1795–1797)
Batavian Republic (1795–1806); Kingdom of Holland (1806–1810)			associated with French First Republic (1795–1804) part of First French Empire (1804–1815)				
part of First French Empire (1810–1813)			associated with French First Republic (1795–1804) part of First French Empire (1804–1815)				
Sovereign Principality of the Netherlands (1813–1815)			associated with French First Republic (1795–1804) part of First French Empire (1804–1815)				
United Kingdom of the Netherlands (1815–1830)							Grand Duchy of Luxembourg (from 1815)
Kingdom of the Netherlands (from 1839)				Kingdom of Belgium (from 1830)			Grand Duchy of Luxembourg (from 1815)
Kingdom of the Netherlands (from 1839)				Kingdom of Belgium (from 1830)			Grand Duchy of Luxembourg (from 1890)

After the 1548 Diet of Augsburg, the circle was made up of the following territories:

=== Netherlands ===
Name	Type of entity	Comments
Antwerp	Marquisate	(Antorf)
Artois	County	(Artesien) Ceded by France in 1493, annexed by France in 1659.
Batenburg	Lordship	Transferred to the Burgundian Circle in 1548.
Brabant	Duchy	
Breda	Barony	Held by the Counts of Nassau.
Culemborg	County	Transferred to the Burgundian Circle in 1548. Raised to a county in 1555. Vassal of the Dutch Republic in 1588.
Dalhem	County	Transferred to the Burgundian Circle in 1548. Personal union with the Dukes of Brabant as the Lands of Overmaas.
Drenthe	County	Transferred to the Burgundian Circle in 1548. Held by the Lordship of Groningen.
Egmond	County	
Flanders	County	(Flandern)
Friesland	Lordship	Seceded to form part of the United Provinces in 1579.
Groningen	Free Imperial City	Transferred to the Burgundian Circle in 1548.
Groningen	Lordship	Transferred to the Burgundian Circle in 1548. A grouping of the former Ommelanden, which seceded to form part of the United Provinces in 1579, and the City of Groningen, which joined the United Provinces in 1594.
Guelders	Duchy	(Geldern) Transferred to the Burgundian Circle in 1548. Which, with the exception of Upper Guelders, seceded to form part of the United Provinces from 1579.
Hainaut	County	(Hennegau)
Herzogenrath	Lordship	Transferred to the Burgundian Circle in 1548. Personal union with the Dukes of Brabant as the Lands of Overmaas.
Holland	County	Seceded in 1579 to become part of the United Provinces.
Horne	County	In a personal union with the Prince-Bishopric of Liège after 1568. Annexed by France in 1795.
IJsselstein	Barony	(Ysselstein) Held by the Count of Egmond.
Jever	Lordship	Unencircled until transferred to the Burgundian Circle in 1548. To Holland in 1807.
Limburg	Duchy	Transferred to the Burgundian Circle in 1548. Held by the Dukes of Brabant.
Lingen	County	Transferred to the Burgundian Circle in 1548. Part of the Netherlands since 1648, under Prussian rule since 1702.
Lothier	Duchy	Honourific title associated with the territory within the former Duchy of Lower Lotharingia. Held by the Duchy of Brabant.
Luxembourg	Duchy	(Luxemburg)
Maastricht	Free Imperial City	Annexed by France in 1794.
Mechelen	Lordship	(Mecheln) A personal lordship of the Duke of Burgundy.
Namur	County	(Namür)
Overijssel	Lordship	(Oberyssel) Transferred to the Burgundian Circle in 1548. Including the County of Drenthe, which seceded to form part of the United Provinces in 1579.
Tournai	Lordship	(Dornick) Included since 1521. Annexed by French First Republic in 1794.
Utrecht	Prince-Bishopric	Transferred to the Burgundian Circle in 1548. Later Lordship of Utrecht. which seceded to form part of the United Provinces in 1579.
Valkenburg	County	Transferred to the Burgundian Circle in 1548. Personal union with the Dukes of Brabant as the Lands of Overmaas.
Zeeland	County	(Seeland) Held by the Counts of Holland; seceded to form part of the United Provinces in 1579.
Zutphen	County	(Zütphen) Held by the Counts of Holland; seceded to form part of the United Provinces in 1579.

=== County of Burgundy ===
Name	Type of entity	Commentate
Burgundy	County	(Burgund) Transferred to the Burgundian Circle in 1548. Annexed by France in 1678.
Besançon	Prince-Bishopric	(Bisanz) Transferred to the Burgundian Circle in 1548. Annexed by France in 1678.
Besançon	Free Imperial City	(Bisanz) Transferred to the Burgundian Circle in 1548. Lost Imperial status in 1651, becoming Free City of Besançon. Annexed by France in 1678.
Charolais	County	Transferred to the Burgundian Circle in 1548. Ownership was confirmed in the Treaty of Paris to Margaret of Austria. Annexed by France in 1678.
Chaussin	Lordship	Transferred to the Burgundian Circle in 1548. Ownership was confirmed in the Treaty of Paris to Margaret of Austria. Annexed by France in 1678.
Laperrière	Marquisate	Transferred to the Burgundian Circle in 1548. Ownership was confirmed in the Treaty of Paris to Margaret of Austria. Annexed by France in 1678.
Salins	Lordship	Transferred to the Burgundian Circle in 1548. Annexed by France in 1678.

== History ==
The Imperial Seventeen Provinces emerged from the Burgundian Netherlands ruled in personal union by the French Dukes of Burgundy. Most of the seventeen had been fiefs of the Holy Roman Empire on the territory of Lower Lorraine, except for Flanders and Artois. In 1482, they fell to the House of Habsburg.

Coat of arms of the Duke

In 1363, the French King John II of Valois enfeoffed his youngest son Philip the Bold with the Duchy of Burgundy (Bourgogne). Philip in 1369 married Margaret of Dampierre, the only child of Count Louis II of Flanders (d. 1384), whose immense dowry not only included Flanders and Artois but also the Imperial County of Burgundy. He thereby became the progenitor of the House of Valois-Burgundy, which systematically came into possession of different Imperial fiefs: his grandson Philip the Good, Duke of Burgundy from 1419, purchased Namur in 1429, and inherited the duchies of Brabant and Limburg from his cousin Philip of Saint-Pol in 1430. In 1432, he forced Jacqueline of Wittelsbach to cede him the counties of Hainaut and Holland along with Zeeland, under the Treaty of Delft, and finally occupied Luxembourg, exiling Duchess Elisabeth of Görlitz in 1443.

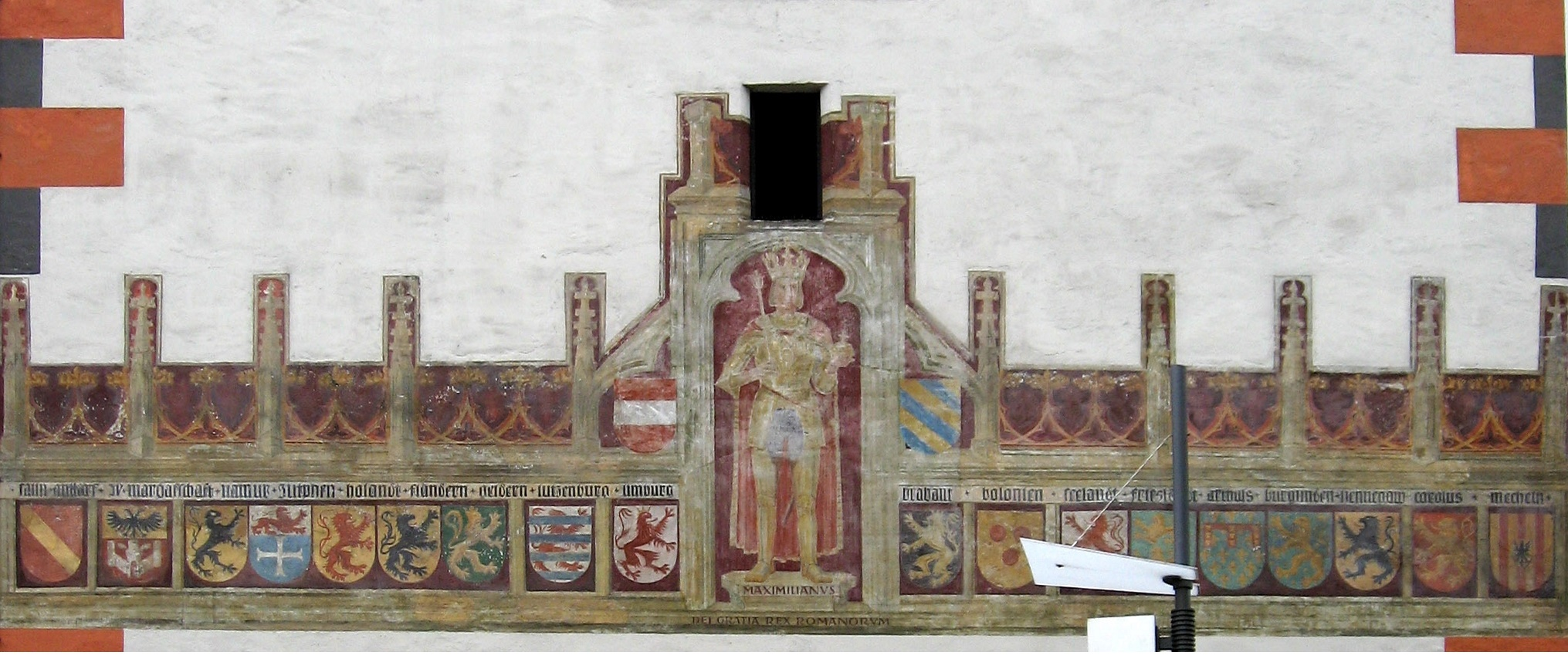
Emperor Maximilian I and the coat of arms of the Burgundian provinces, wall fresco at the Vöcklabruck City Tower, 1502.

Coat of arms of the Staten General

The Burgundian State then bore a faint resemblance to the early medieval Lotharingia, but fell suddenly with the death of the ambitious Charles the Bold. In 1473, he had agreed with Frederick III, Holy Roman Emperor to marry his daughter Mary the Rich to the Emperor's son Archduke Maximilian I of Austria in exchange for the elevation of his Imperial territories to a "Kingdom of Burgundy", co-equal to the French kingdom of his Valois cousins. The Prince-electors, however, forestalled these plans, and Duke Charles started a desperate campaign against the Duchy of Lorraine and was killed at the 1477 Battle of Nancy. To secure her heritage against King Louis XI of France, his daughter Mary nevertheless married Maximilian the same year. The Archduke defeated the French troops at the 1479 Battle of Guinegate and by the 1493 Treaty of Senlis annexed the Seventeen Provinces – including the French fiefs of Flanders and Artois – for the House of Habsburg. The sovereignty finally passed to the Empire in the Treaty of Cambrai in 1529. The Duchy of Burgundy proper was seized as a reverted fief by the French crown.

Flag of the Netherlands

Maximilian's grandson and successor, Charles V, Holy Roman Emperor eventually won the Guelders Wars and united all seventeen provinces under his rule, the last one being the Duchy of Guelders in 1543. The Burgundian treaty of 1548 shifted the seventeen provinces from the Lower Rhenish–Westphalian Circle to the Burgundian circle, resulting in a significant territorial gain for the latter and increased tax obligation. The Pragmatic Sanction of 1549 determined that the Provinces should remain united in the future and inherited by the same monarch. After Charles V's abdication in 1556, his realms became divided between his son, King Philip II of Spain, and his brother, Emperor Ferdinand I. The Seventeen Provinces went to his son Philip. Meanwhile, a common political representation was established through the States General of the Netherlands.

Conflicts between Philip II and his Dutch subjects led to the Eighty Years' War, which started in 1568. The seven northern provinces gained their independence as a republic called the Seven United Provinces. They were:

1. the Lordship of Groningen and of the Ommelanden
2. the Lordship of Friesland
3. the Lordship of Overijssel
4. the Duchy of Guelders (except its upper quarter) and the County of Zutphen
5. the Lordship of Utrecht
6. the County of Holland
7. the County of Zeeland

The southern provinces – Flanders, Brabant, Namur, Hainaut, Luxembourg and so forth – were restored to Spanish rule thanks to the military and political talent of the Duke of Parma, especially at the siege of Antwerp (1584-1585). Hence, these Provinces became known as the Spanish Netherlands.

The northern Seven United Provinces kept parts of Limburg, Brabant and Flanders during and after the Eighty Years' War (see: Generality Lands), which ended with the Treaty of Westphalia in 1648.

Artois, and parts of Flanders and Hainaut were ceded to France in the treaties of the Pyrenees and Nijmegen in the course of the 17th century.

== See also ==
- Burgundian Netherlands
- Habsburg Netherlands
- Spanish Netherlands
- Austrian Netherlands
- Seventeen Provinces
- History of Burgundy
- Spanish Road

== Sources ==
- Mout, Nicolette (2012). "Core and Periphery: The Netherlands and the Empire from the Late Fifteenth to the Early Seventeenth Century". The Holy Roman Empire, 1495-1806: A European Perspective. Leiden-Boston: Brill. pp. 203–215.
