= Burgundian treaty of 1548 =

The Burgundian treaty of 1548 (ratified on 26 June), also known as the Transaction of Augsburg, settled the status of the Habsburg Netherlands within the Holy Roman Empire.

== History ==
Essentially the work of Viglius van Aytta, it represents a first step towards the emergence of the Netherlands as an independent territory. It was made possible politically by the French loss of Artois and Flanders. Administratively, a chancellery and tribunal was established at Mechelen which for the first time had as its jurisdiction "the Netherlands" exclusively. The treaty resulted in a significant shift of territories from the Lower Rhenish-Westphalian Circle to the Burgundian Circle. The newly formed administrative division of the empire now united all Burgundian territories, which were no longer subject to the Reichskammergericht. To compensate for its territorial gain, the Burgundian Circle was now obliged to pay taxes equivalent to those of two prince-electorates, and in war taxes towards the Turkish Wars even equivalent to three prince-electorates.

To ensure that the Burgundian territory now united in the Burgundian Circle would remain under a single administration, Charles V in the following year promulgated the Pragmatic Sanction of 1549 which declared the Seventeen Provinces of the Netherlands a single indivisible possession not to be divided in future inheritance.

The consequence of these attempts at reducing the fragmentation of the government of the Holy Roman Empire was the separation of the Netherlands as an entity apart from the remaining empire, forming an important step towards the formation of the Dutch Republic in 1581.

== Territories ==
The treaty, written in Neo-Latin, stipulates in Article 15 that the territories mentioned are to become a single unit that will be passed on undivided to the next generations after Charles V (speaking in majestic plural) through hereditary succession:

Latin text	German text	English translation
Nimirum, nos veros, haereditarios & supremos Dominos dictarum nostrarum provinciarum Patrimonialium Belgicarum, pro Nobis, nostris haeredibus & successoribus, simul dictae nostrae Provinciae Patrimoniales Belgicae, nominatim Ducatus Lotharingiae, Brabantiae, Limburgi, Luxemburgi, Geldriae; Comitatus Flandriae, Artesiae, Burgundiae, Hannoniae, Hollandiae, Selandiae, Namurci, Zutphaniae; Marchionatus S. R. Imperii, Dominia Frisiae, Ultraiecti, Transisalaniae, Groningae, Falcomontis, Dalhemii, Salinis, Mechliniae & Traecti, una cum omnibus eorundem appendicibus & incorporationibus, Principatibus, Praelaturis, Dignitatibus, Comitatibus, Baroniis & Dominiis ad ea pertinentibus Vasallis & appendicibus, futuros in posterum & semper sub protectione, custodia, conservatione & auxilio Imperatorum & Regum Romanorum & S. R. I. eosque fruituros libertatibus ac iuribus eiusdem, & per dictos Imperatores & Reges Romanorum, & status dicti S. R. I. semper, sicut alii Principes, status & membra eiusdem Imperii, defendos, conservandos, fovendos, & fideliter iuvandos.	...dergestalt daß wir, als rechter Erb und Oberherr gemelter unserer Nider-Erblanden, für uns unsere Erben und Nachkommen sambt derselbigen nachbenannten unsern Nider-Erblanden, nemlich, Hertzogthumb Lothringen, Braband, Limburg, Lützenburg, Geldern, die Graffschafft Flandern, Arthoys, Burgund, Hennigau, Holland, Seeland, Namur, Züthphen, die Marggraffschafft deß Heiligen Reichs, die Herrschafft Frießland, Utricht, Ober-Issel, Gröningen, Falckenberg, Thalheim, Salin, Mecheln und Mastrich, mit allen deren mediate vel immediate zugehörigen und einverleibten Geistlichen und Weltlichen Fürstenthumen, Prælaturen, Dignitäten, Graffschafften, Frey- und Herrschafften und der zugehörigen Vasallen, Unterthanen und Verwandten, hinfüro zu ewigen Zeiten in der Röm. Kayser und Könige und deß H. Reichs Schuß, Schirm, Vertheydigung und Hülffe seyn, auch sich dessen Freyheiten, Rechten und Gerechtigkeiten freuen und gebrauchen und von gemelten Röm. Kaysern, Königen und deß H. Reichs Ständen jederzeit wie andere Fürsten, Stände und Glieder desselben H. Reichs (...)	Evidently, our aforementioned Patrimonial Belgian Provinces [Nether-Heirlands], for Ourselves, our heirs and successors, us [being] the real, hereditary and supreme Lords of our aforementioned Patrimonial Belgian provinces [Nether-Heirlands], namely the Duchies of Lotharingia, Brabant, Limburg, Luxemburg, and Guelders; the Counties of Flanders, Artois, Burgundy, Hainaut, Holland, Zeeland, Namur, and Zutphen; the March of the Holy Roman Empire; the Lordships of Frisia, Utrecht, Overijssel, Groningen, Valkenburg, Dalhem, Salins, Mechelen, and Maastricht, along with all of their appendages and incorporations, princes, prelatures, dignitaries, counts, barons and lords that belong to certain vassals and appendices, will in the future be one, and always under the protection, custody, conservation and assistance of the Emperors and Kings of the Romans and the Holy Roman Empire, and will enjoy the liberties and rights of the same [Empire], and will forever after be faithfully defended, conserved, supported and assisted by the aforementioned the Emperors and Kings of the Romans and the Holy Roman Empire, just like the other princes, states and members of the same Empire. (Note: The translation of the names of the territories is partially based on the Dutch publication Geschiedenis der staatsinstellingen (1922).)

=== Map gallery ===
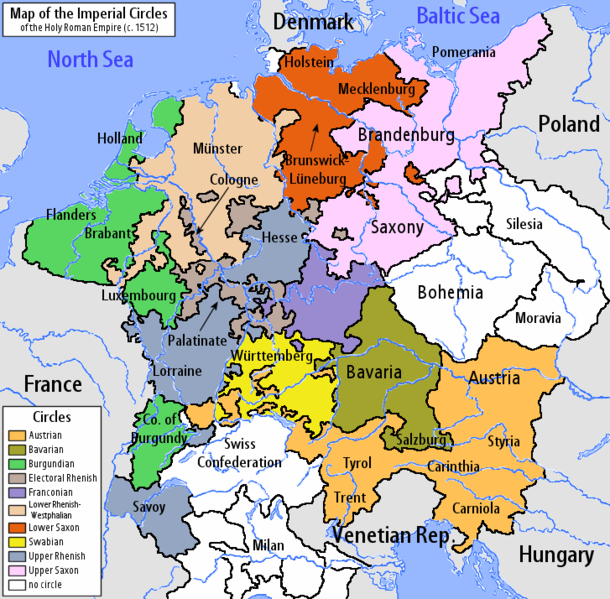
Imperial Circles in 1512.
Burgundian Circle
Lower Rhenish–Westphalian Circle

Imperial Circles in 1560.
Burgundian Circle
Lower Rhenish–Westphalian Circle

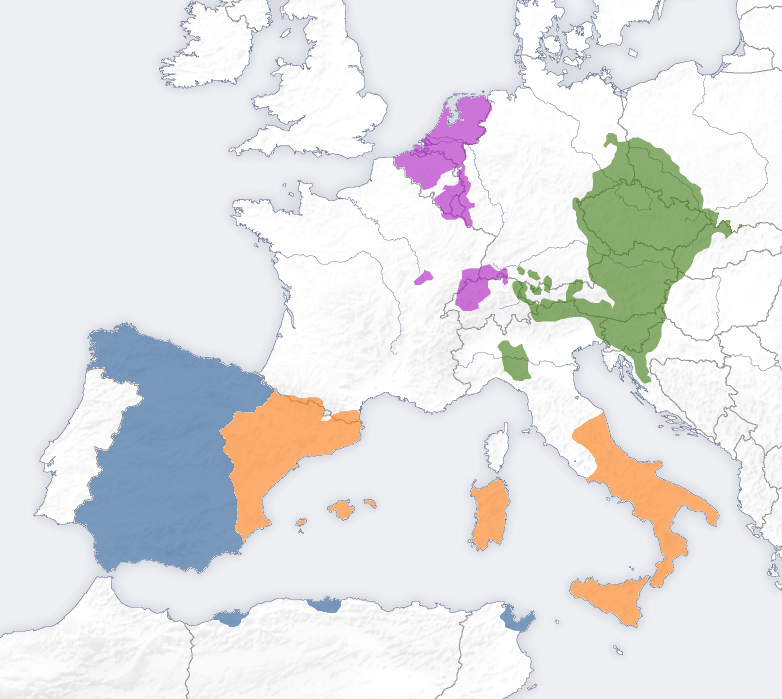
Possessions of emperor Charles V c. 1550.
Habsburg Netherlands, Franche-Comté, and Charolais
Austrian Erblande, Bohemian Crown Lands, and Milan
Crown of Castile
Crown of Aragon

The Low Countries in 1560.
Habsburg Netherlands
Prince-Bishopric of Liège
Principality of Stavelot-Malmedy
Prince-Bishopric of Cambrésis

The Low Countries in 1555.
Habsburg Netherlands

== Bibliography ==
=== Primary sources ===
- Kahlen, Ludewig Martin (1744). Corpus iuris publici, Das ist, Vollständige Sammlung der wichtigsten Grundgesetze des Heiligen Römischen Reichs Deutscher Nation, gesammelt, verbessert, mit Anmerkungen under Parallelen, wie auch einer Vorrede versehen. Göttingen: Schmid Brothers. p. 389. (Latin and German)
- Münchener Digitalisierungszentrum (1548). 'Burgundischer Vertrag zwischen der Röm. Kays. Majest. und deren Burgundischen und Nieder-Erblanden 1548' (in German). Bavarian State Library. p. 16.

=== Scholarly literature ===
- Rachfahl, Felix (1900). "Die Trennung der Niederlande vom deutschen Reiche". Westdeutsche Zeitschrift für Geschichte und Kunst. 19: 79–119.
- Mout, Nicolette (1995). "Die Niederlande und das Reich im 16. Jahrhundert". In Press, Volker; Stievermann, Dieter (eds.). Alternativen zur Reichsverfassung in der Frühen Neuzeit?. pp. 143–168.
- Dotzauer, Winfried (1998). Die deutschen Reichskreise (1383–1806). Geschichte und Aktenedition. Steiner. pp. 390 ff., 565 ff. ISBN 3-515-07146-6.
