= Generality Lands =

Lands controlled by the States-General of the Seven Provinces

Generality Lands Generaliteitslanden (Dutch) Pays de la Généralité (French)
- Federal territories of the Netherlands
- 1648–1795
- The Dutch Republic 1715–1785 Generality Lands
- Capital: 's-Hertogenbosch
- Legislature: Council of State
- History
  - Union of Utrecht: 1579
  - Peace of Westphalia: 1648
  - Batavian Revolution: 1795
- Today part of: Netherlands; Belgium

The Generality Lands (Dutch: Generaliteitslanden), also translated as Lands of the Generality or Common Lands, were strongly Catholic territories of the Republic of the Seven United Netherlands that were directly governed by the States-General. Unlike the seven provinces of Holland, Zeeland, Utrecht, Guelders, Overijssel, Friesland and Groningen, these territories had no States-Provincial and were not represented in the central government, despite making up about one fifth of the Republic's total territory. At the time of the Union of Utrecht, these territories were under Spanish control, and would only be conquered by the Dutch Republic throughout the course of the Eighty Years' War. From an economic point of view, they were exploited with heavy taxes and levies.

== History ==
History of the Low Countries (schematic)
Frisii		Germanic tribes		Belgae & Celts			
Frisii	Cana– nefates (Note: Roman foederati)	Chamavi, Tubantes (Note: The Chamavi merged into the confederation of the Franks; the Tubantes merged into the confederation of the Saxons.)		Gallia Belgica (55 BC–c. 5th century AD); Germania Inferior (83–c. 5th century)			
Frisii	Cana– nefates	Salian Franks		Batavi			
unpopulated (4th –c. 5th centuries)		Saxons	Salian Franks (4th–c. 5th centuries)				
Frisian Kingdom (c. 6th century – 734)		Saxons	Frankish Kingdom (481–843)—Carolingian Empire (800–843)				
Frisian Kingdom (c. 6th century – 734)		Austrasia (511–687)					
Middle Francia (843–855)				West; Francia (from 843)	Middle Francia (843–855)		
Kingdom of Lotharingia (Note: Part of East Francia after 939, divided in Upper Lorraine (as part of West Francia) and Lower Lorraine (as part of East Francia) in 959.) (855–959); Duchy of Lower Lorraine (Note: Lower Lorraine—also referred to as Lothier—disintegrated into several smaller independent territories and only the title of a "Duke of Lothier" remained, held by Brabant.) (from 959)			Kingdom of Lotharingia (855–959); Duchy of Lower Lorraine (from 959)	West; Francia (from 843)	Kingdom of Lotharingia (855–959); Duchy of Lower Lorraine (from 959)		
Frisia			Kingdom of Lotharingia (855–959); Duchy of Lower Lorraine (from 959)	County of Flanders (Note: Including County of Artois (part of Flanders until 1237) and Tournaisis.) (862–1384)	Kingdom of Lotharingia (855–959); Duchy of Lower Lorraine (from 959)		
Frisian; Freedom (Note: Lordship of Frisia and Lordship of Groningen (including the Ommelanden) after 1524 and 1536 respectively.) (11th–16th centuries)	County of Holland (Note: Including County of Zeeland, that was ruled by neighboring County of Holland and County of Flanders (until 1432).) (880–1432)	Bishopric of Utrecht (Note: Utrecht included Lordship of Overijssel (until 1528), County of Drenthe (until 1528) and County of Zutphen (until 1182).) (695–1456)	Duchy of Brabant (Note: Duchy of Brabant included since 1288 also the Duchy of Limburg (now part of Belgium's Liège Province) and the "Overmaas" lands Dalhem, Valkenburg and Herzogenrath (now part of the Dutch Province of Limburg).) (1183–1430) Duchy of Guelders (Note: The county, later duchy, of Guelders consisted of four quarters, as they were separated by rivers: situated upstream Upper Quarter (the present day northern half of the Dutch province of Limburg), spatially separated from the three downstream Lower Quarters: County of Zutphen (after 1182), Veluwe Quarter and Nijmegen Quarter. The three lower quarters emerged from the historic gau Hamaland (named after the Chamavi tribe), and formed the present day province of Gelderland. Guelders did not include the Cleves enclave Huissen and the independent counties of Buren and Culemborg, that were much later seceded to the province of Gelderland.) (1046–1543)	County of Flanders (862–1384)	County of Hainaut (1071–1432) County of Namur (981–1421)	Prince- Bishopric of Liège (Note: Throughout the Middle Ages, the bishopric was further expanded with the Duchy of Bouillon in 1096 (ceded to France in 1678), the acquisition of the county of Loon in 1366 and the county of Horne in 1568. The Lordship of Mechelen was also part of the Prince-Bishopric of Liège.)(980–1791)	Duchy of Luxembourg (1059–1443)
Frisian; Freedom (11th–16th centuries)	Burgundian Netherlands (1384–1482)					Prince- Bishopric of Liège (980–1791)	Burgundian Netherlands (1384–1482)
Habsburg Netherlands (1482–1795) (Seventeen Provinces after 1543) (Note: The name Seventeen Provinces came in use after the Habsburg emperor Charles V had re-acquired the Duchy of Guelders, and an continuous territory arose.)						Prince- Bishopric of Liège (980–1791)	Habsburg Netherlands (1482–1795) (Seventeen Provinces after 1543)
Dutch Republic (1581–1795)				Spanish Netherlands (1556–1714)		Prince- Bishopric of Liège (980–1791)	Spanish Netherlands (1556–1714)
Dutch Republic (1581–1795)				Austrian Netherlands (1714–1795)		Prince- Bishopric of Liège (980–1791)	Austrian Netherlands (1714–1795)
Dutch Republic (1581–1795)				United States of Belgium (1790)		Republic of Liège (1789–'91)	United States of Belgium (1790)
Dutch Republic (1581–1795)				Austrian Netherlands (1795–1797)		P.-Bish. of Liège (1791–1794)	Austrian Netherlands (1795–1797)
Batavian Republic (1795–1806); Kingdom of Holland (1806–1810)			associated with French First Republic (1795–1804) part of First French Empire (1804–1815)				
part of First French Empire (1810–1813)			associated with French First Republic (1795–1804) part of First French Empire (1804–1815)				
Sovereign Principality of the Netherlands (1813–1815)			associated with French First Republic (1795–1804) part of First French Empire (1804–1815)				
United Kingdom of the Netherlands (1815–1830)							Grand Duchy of Luxembourg (from 1815)
Kingdom of the Netherlands (from 1839)				Kingdom of Belgium (from 1830)			Grand Duchy of Luxembourg (from 1815)
Kingdom of the Netherlands (from 1839)				Kingdom of Belgium (from 1830)			Grand Duchy of Luxembourg (from 1890)

In the latter years of the Eighty Years' War the Generality Lands came under control of the Dutch Republic, and this situation was consolidated by the Treaty of Westphalia in 1648. Most of the territories had no provincial government because they were cut off from their original governments, which remained under Spanish rule. In contrast to the northern seven provinces, the population of the Generality Lands was overwhelmingly Roman Catholic. The prefix Staats- indicates that this part of the province was under general States rule, as a dependent territory. For both the Generality Lands and the Dutch colonies, sovereignty was claimed by the Generality on the basis right of conquest.

Post 1648, there were four primary Generality Lands:

- States' Brabant (Staats-Brabant): the northern part of the Duchy of Brabant (the bulk of the present-day province of North Brabant), including the so-called Redemptiedorpen.
- States' Flanders (Staats-Vlaanderen): the northern part of the County of Flanders, present-day Zeelandic Flanders. The predominantly Protestant lands of Axel had special status and representation in the States of Zeeland, as did the forts of Lillo, Liefkenshoek, Kruisschans and Frederik Hendrik.
- States' Overmaas (Staats-Overmaas): the Lands of Overmaas – several small territories between Maastricht, Liège and Aachen, including the County of Dalhem (Dalhem), Valkenburg Land (Valkenburg) and the Herzogenrath Land (Hertogenrade). The city of Maastricht was a condominium of the United Provinces and the Prince-Bishopric of Liège. Overmaas literally means "beyond the Meuse" or "Trans-Meuse" (from the perspective of Brussels). The 19th century term "Staats-Limburg", invented for nationalistic reasons, is historically and geographically incorrect.
- States' Upper Guelders (Staats-Opper-Gelre): as a result of the Treaty of Utrecht (1713) a part of Spanish Guelders, including Venlo and Echt, was ceded to the United Provinces, while another part went to Prussia and a small part around Roermond was left for the Austrian duchy of Guelders.

Westerwolde and Wedde: what is now the southeastern part of the province of Groningen was a generality land between 1594 and 1619, after which it became part of that province.

Territories of the Dutch Republic outside Europe were also under general States rule, for example Staten Island in present-day New York City. New Zealand was also originally called Staten Landt after its Dutch discovery.

Although sovereign and a member of the Union in the same way as the Seven Provinces of the Netherlands, the Protestant majority County of Drenthe also lacked representation in the States-General like the Generality Lands. However, due to its poverty, Drenthe was also exempt from Union taxation.

After the French occupation of the Southern Netherlands and the proclamation of the Batavian Republic in 1795 the Generality Lands ceased to exist. Staats-Brabant became a département in the Batavian Republic (Bataafs-Brabant). Staats-Vlaanderen became part of the French département Escaut. Staats-Overmaas and Staats-Opper-Gelre became parts of the French départements of Roer and Meuse-Inférieure.

When French rule ended and the United Kingdom of the Netherlands began, the former Generality lands were folded into the provinces. Bataafs-Brabant was merged with a number of formerly semi-independent Holy Roman fiefs and part of the province of Holland to become the province of North Brabant; Staats-Vlaanderen was incorporated into the province of Zeeland; and most parts of Staats-Opper-Gelre and Staats-Overmaas were merged with territories gained from Prussia to form the province of Limburg, with the rest going to Prussia.
