= Cambrésis =

Traditional county of Picardy

Cambrésis in the late 13th century
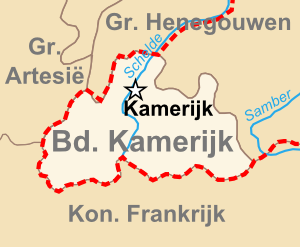

Cambrésis within modern Hauts-de-France

Cambrésis (French: [kɑ̃bʁezi], Dutch: Kamerijk, German: Kammerich) is a former pagus and county of the medieval Holy Roman Empire, which constituted the Prince-Bishopric of Cambrai from the 11th to the 18th centuries. It was annexed by the Kingdom of France in 1679. It is now regarded as one of the "natural regions" of France, and roughly equivalent to the Arrondissement of Cambrai in department Nord. The capital of Cambrésis was Cambrai. Originally ruled by a dynasty of counts, Cambrésis became a prince-bishopric in 1007, comparable to the Prince-Bishopric of Liège and the Prince-Bishopric of Utrecht. It encompassed the territory in which the bishop of Cambrai had secular authority.

== History ==
=== Romans ===
Cameracum became important during the Roman Empire in the 3rd and 4th century due to its textile industry, taking over as administrative capital of the civitas Nerviorum from Bagacum Nerviorum (modern Bavay) around 400. As a Roman cultural capital it maintained its importance as the seat of a bishop (which it became before 400), whose jurisdiction stretched to medieval Hainaut and Brabant in the north.

=== Early middle ages and the Franks ===
Early medieval sources such as Volume II of Gregory of Tours' History of the Franks (written late 6th century) and the anonymous Liber historiae Francorum (written early 8th century) mention a Salian Frankish warlord named Chlodio or Chlogio, who conquered Turnacum (modern Tournai) and Cameracum in the 5th century. According to Lanting & van der Plicht (2010), this probably happened in the period 445–450. Around 509, the ruler of Cameracum, Ragnachar, was killed by his relative Clovis I, who then annexed the Frankish state around Cameracum. As an early Frankish territory, the Pagus Cambrecensis can be found in surviving records as early as 663.

When the Frankish kingdom was divided in 843, Cambrai became part of Middle Francia and subsequently Lotharingia, with which it Cambrai came into the possession of East Francia (and subsequently the Holy Roman Empire) in 925. Together with the surrounding area, Cambrai constituted a county, which would become known as Cambrésis, the genitive of Cambrai. The last dynastic count, Arnulf of Valenciennes, renounced his comital rights to Cambrésis to obtain the support of the bishop of Cambrai against his enemy Baldwin IV, Count of Flanders.

=== Prince-bishopric ===
The German king Henry II transferred the comital rights to the bishop of Cambrai in 1007, in line with the Ottonian policy of creating an Imperial Church System. As a worldly lord, the bishop thus became a vassal of the Holy Roman Empire. From the end of the 11th to the end of the 12th century, the emperors designated the counts of Flanders as guardians of the county, resulting in extensive Flemish influence. The city of Cambrai itself resisted episcopal rule ever since 1077, and eventually became a free imperial city in the High Middle Ages.

In the 15th century, the Duchy of Burgundy managed to acquire de facto control over Cambrésis. During the War of the Burgundian Succession (1477–1482) France conquered the city, but Emperor Charles V managed to retrieve Cambrésis for the Holy Roman Empire in 1529 (War of the League of Cognac, ended by the Ladies' Peace of Cambrai), and again in 1543 (Italian War of 1542–1546). Although the Prince-Bishopric of Cambrai was formally neutral, its war-time neutrality was frequently violated by both French and Habsburg troops, and ever since Charles V placed a garrison inside Cambrai in 1543, Cambrésis remained inside the Habsburg sphere of influence until 1679. It was never annexed by Habsburg, however: it was not added to the Burgundian Circle, it was mentioned in neither the Transaction of Augsburg of 1548, nor the Pragmatic Sanction of 1549, it had no representation at the States General of the Habsburg Netherlands, and thus was not one of the Seventeen Provinces.

When the Imperial Circles were introduced in 1500, Cambrésis was included into the Lower Rhenish–Westphalian Circle. In the Imperial Register of 1521, the bishop of Camerich is recorded as having the duty to provide a contingent of 22 men on horse and 82 men on foot, and 120 Rhenish guilders. The 1532 Imperial Register records Camerich in the Niderlendisch vnnd Westuelisch Krayß ('Netherlandish and Westphalian Circle') with the obligation of providing 44 cavalrymen and 164 infantrymen. The Imperial Register of 1663 mentions: 'Vor disem hat man zum Westphälischen Craisse auch gerechnet die Bischöffe von Vtrecht vnd Camerach' ("For this, one has also counted the Bishops of Utrecht and Camerach to the Westphalian Circle").

In their 1654 Topographia Circuli Burgundici, part of Topographia Germaniae series, Martin Zeiler and Matthäus Merian the Elder described Cambrésis as the Stifft Camerich: 'Concerning the Prince-Bishopric of Camerich: formally, this [land] belongs to the [Holy] Roman Empire and to the Westphalian Circle, and in this book, it is also considered as such. The Bishop of this Bishopric, who is both the Spiritual and Temporal Lord there, has his own seat and vote in the Imperial Diet. Nevertheless, the capital city of Camerich, or Cameracum, currently has a Spanish garrison, and this diocese is located between the two Counties of Artois and Hainaut that are under Spanish protection. Moreover, Lodovico Guicciardini mentioned it with Artois, although others mentioned it with Hainaut. Therefore, we also want make a mention of it here. We will wait with the description of this little state until the entry on the city of Camerach, and now order this most distinguished place of these three lands according to the ABC.' Zieler and Merian thus pointed out that Cambrésis was de jure still an independent principality, whose bishop held both secular and religious authority, but it was surrounded by Spanish territories and occupied by Spanish troops, and like other writers before them, they decided to geographically describe Cambrésis in conjunction with the lands of the Burgundian Circle rather than the Westphalian Circle to which Cambrésis officially belonged. The further history of Cambrésis would be related under the entry of the city of Cambrai, which was to be found alphabetically rather than geographically.

=== French annexation ===
Cambrésis was not annexed by the French kings until the 1678 Peace of Nijmegen after a siege in 1677, becoming part of the French province Flandre and Hainaut. The count-bishops continued to refer to themselves as princes of the Holy Roman Empire until the French Revolution. On 2 November 1789, during the French Revolution, all church property was nationalised, which meant the end of Cambrésis.

== Maps ==
Salian Franks' conquest of Tournai and Cambrai around 440.

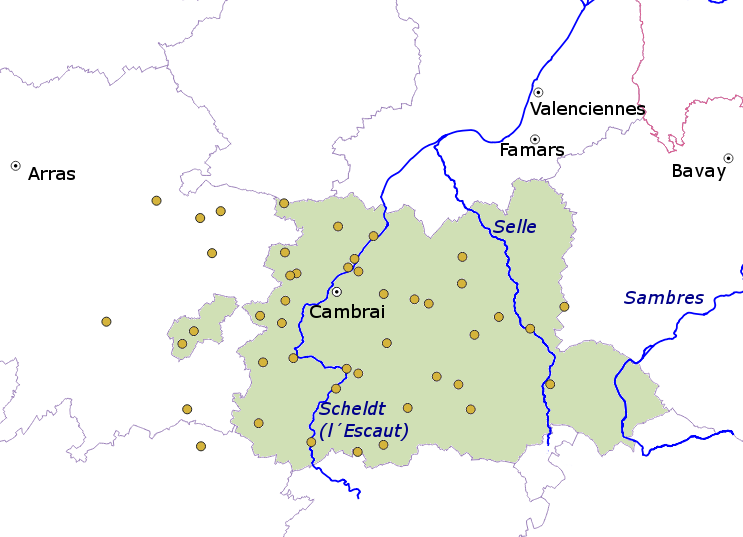
The yellow dots show places in the early medieval Pagus Cambrecensis, and the green is the modern arrondissement.

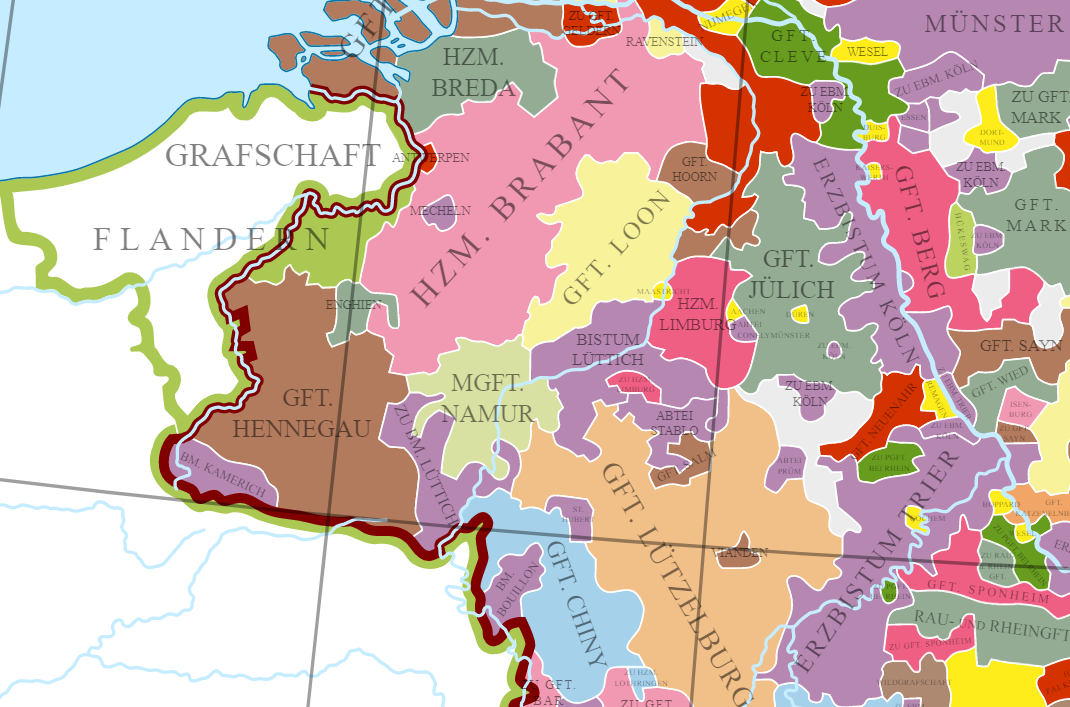
Cambrésis ('BM. Kamerich', left of 'Hennegau') around 1250

Cambrésis ('Kamerijk') in the Low Countries around 1350

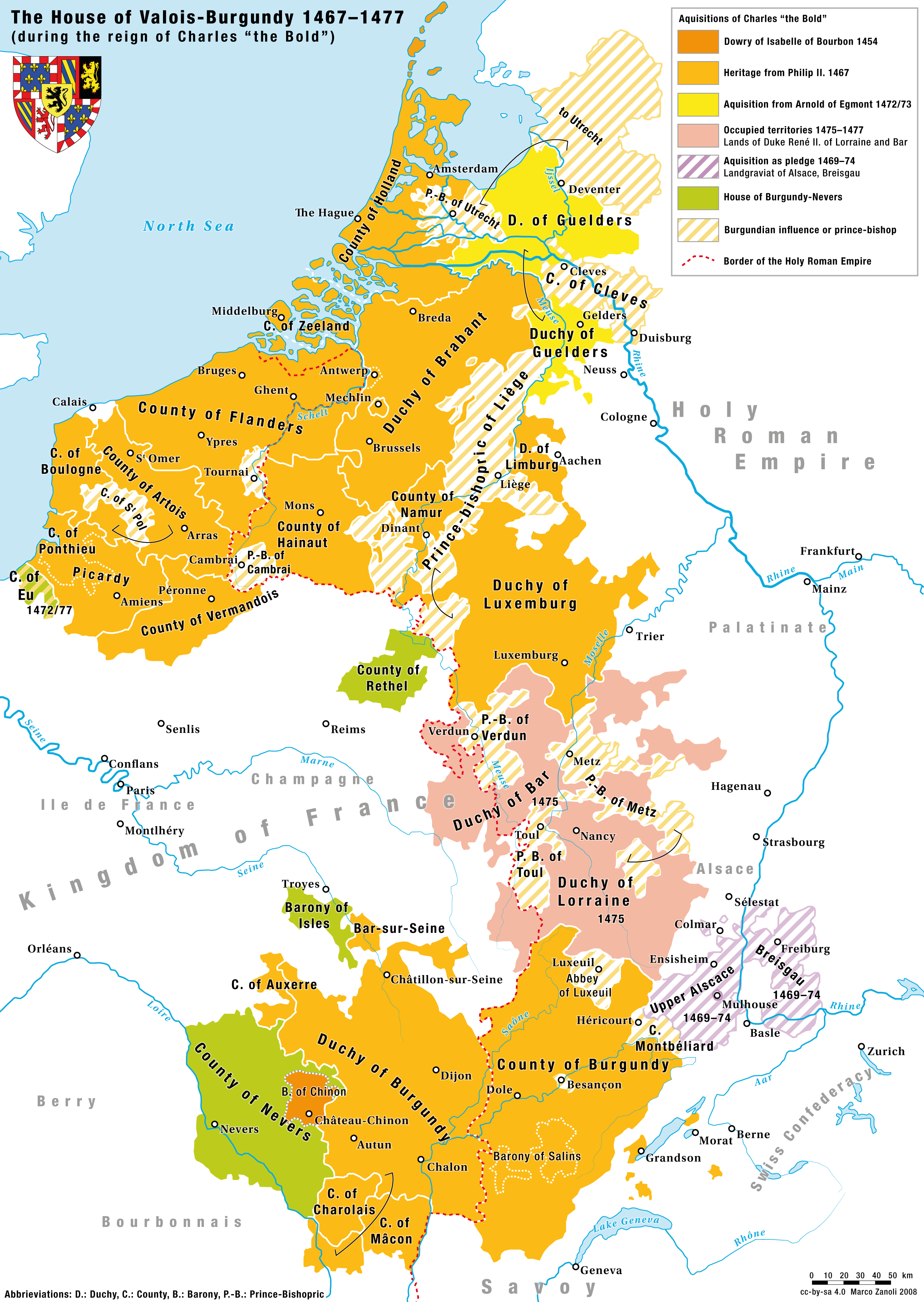
Prince-Bishopric of Cambrai under Burgundian influence in 1465–1477

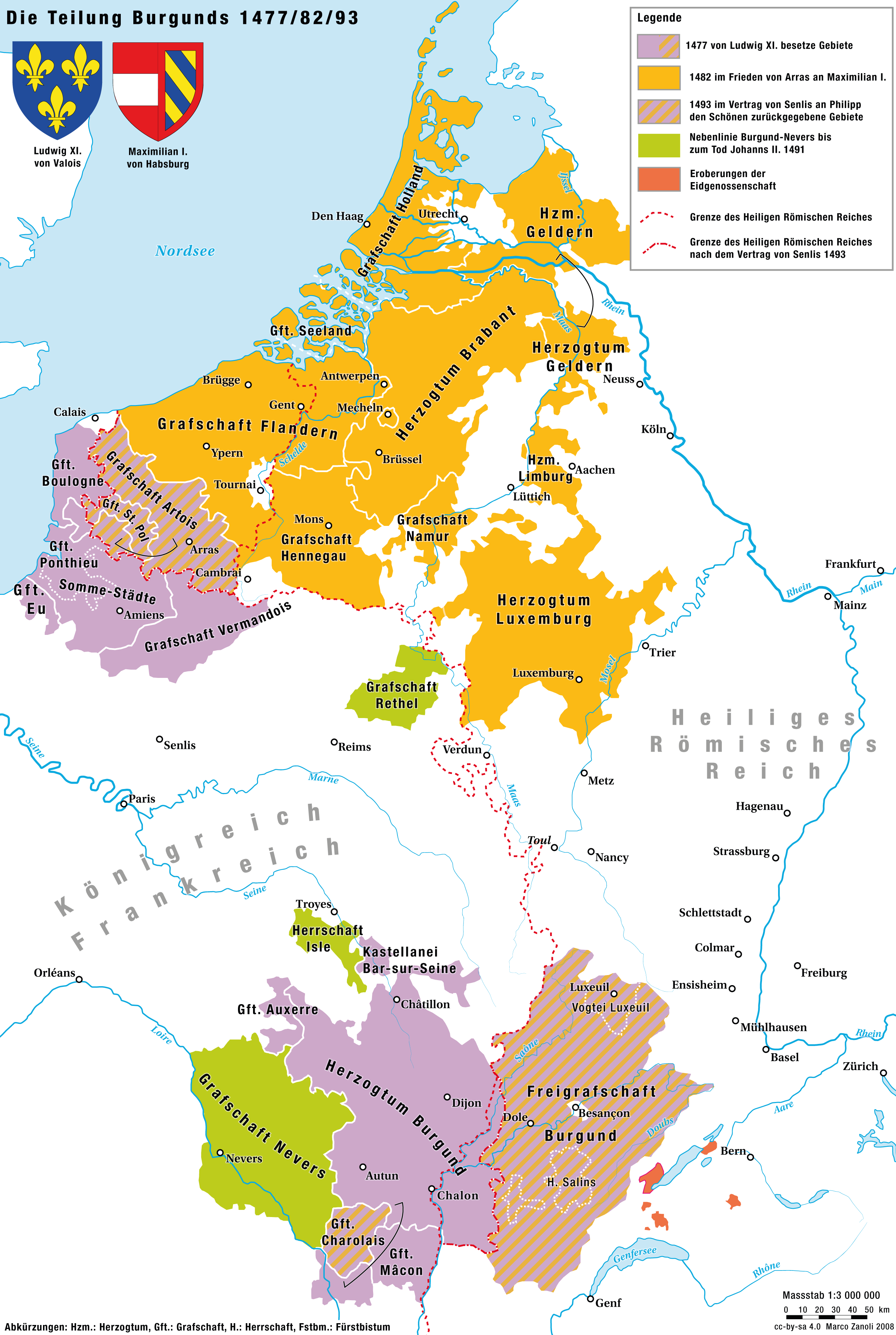
Prince-Bishopric of Cambrai under French rule in 1477–1493

Imperial Circles in 1560.
Burgundian Circle
Lower Rhenish–Westphalian Circle, including Cambrésis

The Low Countries in 1560.
Habsburg Netherlands
Prince-Bishopric of Liège
Principality of Stavelot-Malmedy
Prince-Bishopric of Cambrésis

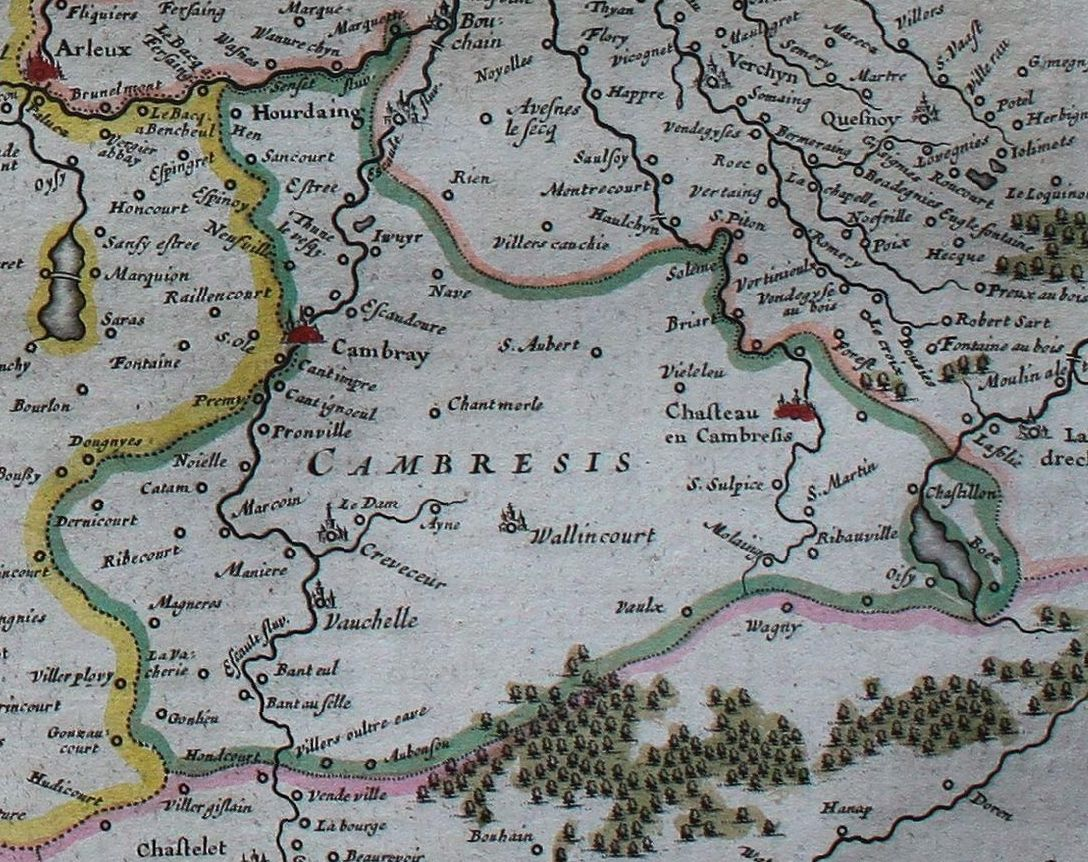
Cambrésis in 1659 by Joan Blaeu

== See also ==
- Le Cateau-Cambrésis
- Roman Catholic Archdiocese of Cambrai
- Le Cambrésis(French)
