= Pragmatic Sanction of 1549 =

Edict of Holy Roman Emperor Charles V establishing the Seventeen Provinces

The Pragmatic Sanction of 1549 was an edict, promulgated by Charles V, Holy Roman Emperor, reorganising the Seventeen Provinces of the present-day Netherlands, Belgium, and Luxembourg into one indivisible territory, while retaining existing customs, laws, and forms of government within the provinces.

It was his plan to centralize the administrative units of the Holy Roman Empire. The Pragmatic Sanction transformed the agglomeration of lands into a unified entity, of which the Habsburgs would be the heirs. By streamlining the succession law in all Seventeen Provinces and declaring that all of them would be inherited by one heir, Charles effectively united the Netherlands as one entity. After Charles's abdication in 1555, the Seventeen Provinces passed to his son, Philip II of Spain.

The Pragmatic Sanction is said to be one example of the Habsburg contest with particularism that contributed to the Dutch Revolt. Each of the provinces had its own laws, customs and political practices. The new policy, imposed from the outside, angered many inhabitants, who viewed their provinces as distinct entities. It and other monarchical acts, such as the creation of bishoprics and promulgation of laws against heresy, stoked resentments, which fired the eruption of the Dutch Revolt.

== Territories ==
The Low Countries in 1560. Habsburg Netherlands Prince-Bishopric of Liège Principality of Stavelot-Malmedy Prince-Bishopric of Cambrésis

The document was written in Middle French. The following territories, collectively called nos Pays de pardeçà ("our Lands around here", meaning the Netherlands, as opposed to nos Pays de par delà, "our Lands over there", meaning the Franche-Comté and originally also the Duchy of Burgundy) are mentioned in the Pragmatic Sanction of 1549:

- Flandres: the County of Flanders (modern Dutch: Vlaanderen; modern French: Flandre)
- Artois or Arthois: the County of Artois (modern Dutch: Artesië; modern French: Artois)
- Haynau: the County of Hainaut (modern Dutch: Henegouwen; modern French: Hainaut)
- Brabant: the Duchy of Brabant
- Luxembourg: the Duchy of Luxembourg (modern Dutch/German: Luxemburg, modern Luxembourgish: Lëtzebuerg)
- Gueldres: the Duchy of Guelders (modern Dutch: Gelre, predecessor of the province of Gelderland)
- Limbourg, Faulquemont, Daelhem et d'autres nos pays d'Outremeuse: the Duchy of Limburg, the County of Valkenburg (modern French: Fauquemont), the County of Dalhem and 'our' [=Habsburg's] other Lands of Overmaas
- Holland: the County of Holland
- Namur: the County of Namur (modern Dutch: Namen)
- Frize: the Lordship of Frisia (modern Dutch: Friesland; modern Frisian: Fryslân)
- Overyssel et Groeninghe: the Lordship of Overijssel and the Lordship of Groningen
- Uytrecht: the Lordship of Utrecht
- Lille, Douay et Orchies: the castellanies of Lille (modern Dutch: Rijsel), Douai and Orchies
- Zelande Bewest et Beoisterschelt: the County of Zeeland West and East of the river Scheldt (modern Dutch: Zeeland Bewesten- en Beoostenschelde)
- Malines: the Lordship of Mechelen

== See also ==
- Burgundian treaty of 1548
