= Lands of Overmaas =

Medieval feudal territory in the Low Countries

Lands of Overmaas

Location in the Low Countries

The three constituent Lands of Valkenburg, 's-Hertogenrade and Dalhem

The Lands of Overmaas (Dutch: Landen van Overmaas; French: Pays d'Outre-Meuse) were a collection of lordships near Limburg in the Low Countries which were attached to the Duchy of Brabant and existed from the 13th to 18th centuries.

Acquired by the Valois Dukes of Burgundy along with Brabant in the 15th century, they later passed to the House of Habsburg and were partitioned between the Habsburg Spanish Netherlands and the Dutch Republic in 1648. The Lands of Overmaas ceased to exist as lordships with the abolition of feudalism in 1795, following the annexation of the area by Revolutionary France.

== Etymology ==
The territories' rulers, the Dukes of Brabant, called their possessions in the area De Landen van Overmaas, meaning "the countries over the Meuse". This was because, from their perspective from their residence in Brussels, the area was on the "other side" (that is, the right bank) of the river Meuse (Dutch: Maas).

== History ==
The Lands of Overmaas were a collection of small medieval lordships in the vicinity of Limburg, and located between the cities of Liège, Maastricht and Aachen. They comprised the separate Lands of Valkenburg, 's-Hertogenrade and Dalhem and included the towns of Gangelt and Waldfeucht.

Prior to the end of the 13th century, the lordships were attached to the Duchy of Limburg. In 1283, the last independent ruler of Limburg, Duchess Ermingarde, died, provoking the War of the Limburg Succession. The conflict was concluded with the victory of John I, Duke of Brabant at the Battle of Worringen in 1288. The Duchy of Limburg and its dependent territories then became possessions of the Duke of Brabant. It is at the time of the acquisition by Brabant that the area became known as the "Lands of Overmaas".

Although the Lands of Overmaas remained in personal union with the Duchy of Brabant (as did the Duchy of Limburg), they were rarely under the dukes' control as they were frequently offered as security to their creditors. At the end of the 14th century, the duke pledged the Lands to John of Gronsfeld and Rainald of Schoonvorst as security for large debts. In 1388 and 1389, Philip the Bold, duke of Burgundy bought out the debts and acquired the Lands. This opened the way for the Valois dukes of Burgundy to acquire Brabant as well, adding both to the Burgundian Netherlands. The Lands remained part of the Burgundian territories during the 15th century. Through marriage, the Burgundian Netherlands passed to the House of Habsburg in 1482. When the vast Habsburg possessions were divided between the Spanish and Austrian branches of the dynasty in the 16th century, the Habsburg Netherlands devolved to the Spanish branch. In 1566, the northern Protestant provinces of the Habsburg Netherlands rose in revolt and established the Dutch Republic, with the Spanish Habsburgs retaining control of only the southern Catholic provinces. The Lands of Overmaas formed part of the Spanish Netherlands. They had remained Catholic after the Reformation, and never underwent a major influx of Calvinists in the way that nearby Maastrict had done.

Partition between Spain and the Dutch Republic

In 1632, during the Eighty Years' War between Spain and the Dutch Republic, the area was conquered by the Dutch. In 1648, as part of the terms ending the war, the Lands were agreed to be partitioned but in such a way as to create, what Benjamin J. Kaplan called, a "complex patchwork...with some districts forming isolated islands". The Dutch part of the Lands were administered by the central government as part of the so-called "Generality Lands". As a result of the complexity of the partition, the area became subject to jurisdictional disputes and competing territorial claims. Settlement of a small Calvinist minority did take place in areas controlled by the Dutch Republic but the privileged position of the settlers attracted resentment from the Catholic majority. Unlike anywhere else in the Republic, simultaneum, that is the sharing of churches by Calvinists and Catholics, was mandated.

In 1795, Revolutionary France annexed the southern Low Countries, and feudal land rights were abolished. The Lands of Overmaas were, therefore, integrated into the new département system, and split between the departments of Ourthe and Meuse-Inférieure (Neder-Maas). After the fall of Napoleon in 1815, the area was then partitioned between the new Kingdom of the Netherlands and Rhenish Prussia.

== Language ==
Until the end of the 18th century the Lands of Overmaas were triglossic, that is three languages were in use. The general population spoke a language that was on the German-Dutch dialect continuum. It is impossible to label it as either German or Dutch. Dutch itself was used as the language of government and High German was used in schools and in churches.

== Bibliography ==
- Cortjaens, Wolfgang; De Maeyer, Jan; Verschaffel, Tom (2008). "An upside down world: Regional identity as catalyst for the development of the modern nation states. An introduction.". In Cortjaens, W.; De Maeyer, J.; Verschaffel, T. (eds.). Historism and Cultural Identity in the Rhine-Meuse Region: Tensions Between Nationalism and Regionalism in the Nineteenth Century. Leuven University Press. ISBN 978-90-5867-666-5.
- Darby, Graham (2003). The Origins and Development of the Dutch Revolt. Taylor & Francis. ISBN 978-1-134-52483-9.
- Hof, Flory-Jan (2019). La Belgique et ses identités régionales: Pays d'Outre-Meuse et Pays d'Arlon. L'Harmattan. ISBN 978-2-343-17105-0.
- Kaplan, Benjamin J. (2011). "Biconfessionalism in the Netherlands". In Safley, T.M. (ed.). A Companion to Multiconfessionalism in the Early Modern World. Brill. ISBN 978-90-04-20697-7.
- Kaplan, Benjamin J. (2019). Reformation and the Practice of Toleration: Dutch Religious History in the Early Modern Era. Brill. ISBN 978-90-04-35395-4.
- Price, John L. (2014). Dutch Society: 1588-1713. Taylor & Francis. ISBN 978-1-317-88985-4.
- Simpson, C.A. (2014). "Introduction: the Habsburg Inheritance". In Berenger, J.; Simpson, C.A. (eds.). The Habsburg Empire 1700-1918. Taylor & Francis. ISBN 978-1-317-89573-2.
- Stein, Robert (2017). Magnanimous Dukes and Rising States: The Unification of the Burgundian Netherlands, 1380-1480. Oxford University Press. ISBN 978-0-19-875710-8.
- Waelkens, L. (2015). Amne adverso: Roman Legal Heritage in European Culture. Leuven University Press. ISBN 978-94-6270-054-3.
- Willemyns, Roland (2013). Dutch: Biography of a Language. OUP USA. ISBN 978-0-19-985871-2.
