= Treaty of Paris (1515) =

1515 treaty

The Treaty of Paris was signed on March 24, 1515, by Charles V, then only the Count of Flanders and Duke of Burgundy, and Francis I, newly King of France. The treaty was intended to cement an alliance between Charles V and the House of Valois so Charles V would have the support of Francis I in inheriting Spain, and Francis I would not have opposition from Charles V in his rule of France.

The terms of the treaty were that Renée of France (then four years old) would be married to Charles V at the age of twelve with a dowry of 200,000 silver crowns and the Duchy of Berry, and in return Charles V would not help his grandfather Ferdinand against France. The terms of the treaty were not met by either side.

Francis had just acceded to the throne of France in January 1515, so this was an early attempt to establish good relations, promise mutual military aid and strengthen the League of Cambrai against the Republic of Venice. Charles became King of Spain in January 1516, eventually adding King of Italy and Holy Roman Emperor to his titles; his possessions bordered France on all sides. He and Francis were great rivals throughout their reigns.

== Sources ==
- Philippe Le Bas (1844). Frères, Firmin Didot (ed.). France: Dictionnaire Encyclopédique (in French). Vol. 11. Paris: Longmans, Green. pp. 399–400.
- Lesaffer (2002). "Amicitia in Renaissance peace and alliance treaties (1450-1530)". Journal of the History of International Law. 4 (1). Tilburg University: 77–99. doi:10.1163/15718050220957143.
- Lesaffer, R (2003). "Charles V, Monarchia Universalis and The Law of Nations (1515-1530)". Tijdschrift voor Rechtsgeschiedenis. 71 (1–2). ResearchGate: 79–123. doi:10.1163/157181903100362698a.
