= Habsburg Netherlands =

Entire period of Habsburg rule in the Low Countries (1482-1797)

Habsburg Netherlands Habsburgse Nederlanden (Dutch) Pays-Bas des Habsbourg (French)
- 1482–1797
- Cross of Burgundy Coat of arms (Philip IV)

The Low Countries in 1560.
Habsburg Netherlands
Prince-Bishopric of Liège
Principality of Stavelot-Malmedy
Prince-Bishopric of Cambrésis
- Status: Personal union of Imperial fiefs within Empire
- Capital: De facto: Mechelen until 1530, afterwards Brussels
- Common languages: Dutch; Low Saxon; West Frisian; Walloon; Luxembourgish; French
- Religion: Roman Catholicism (state religion); Protestantism (popular)
- Government: Monarchy
- Historical era: Early modern period
  - Inherited by House of Habsburg: 1482
  - Incorporated into Burgundian Circle: 1512
  - Pragmatic Sanction: 1549
  - Inherited by Habsburg Spain: 1556
  - Peace of Münster: 30 January 1648
  - Treaty of Rastatt: 7 March 1714
  - Battle of Sprimont: 18 September 1794
  - Treaty of Campo Formio: 17 October 1797
Preceded by
Burgundian Netherlands
Prince-Bishopric of Utrecht
Succeeded by
Spanish Netherlands
Dutch Republic
French First Republic

The Habsburg Netherlands (Note: Dutch: Habsburgse Nederlanden; French: Pays-Bas des Habsbourg; in Latin referred to as Belgica) were the parts of the Low Countries that were ruled by sovereigns from the House of Habsburg. Their rule began in 1482 and ended for the Northern Netherlands in 1581 and for the Southern Netherlands in 1797. Habsburg rule began with the accession of Philip the Handsome in 1482, when he succeeded his mother Mary of Burgundy of the House of Valois-Burgundy, who was the ruler of the Low Countries. Philip's son and heir Charles, future King of Spain (1516), and the Holy Roman Emperor (1519), was born in the Habsburg Netherlands and made Brussels one of his capitals.

During the Habsburg era, from 1482 to 1797, parts of the Netherlands under their rule went through various political changes and administrative reorganizations. Becoming known as the Seventeen Provinces in 1549, they were held by the Spanish branch of the Habsburgs from 1556, thus becoming known as the Spanish Netherlands from that time on. In 1581, in the midst of the Dutch Revolt, the Seven United Provinces seceded from the rest of this territory to form the Dutch Republic. The remaining Spanish Southern Netherlands became the Austrian Netherlands in 1714, after Austrian acquisition under the Treaty of Rastatt. De facto Habsburg rule ended with the annexation by the revolutionary French First Republic in 1795. Austria, however, did not relinquish its claim over the country until 1797 in the Treaty of Campo Formio.

== Geography ==
The Habsburg Netherlands was a geo-political entity covering the whole of the Low Countries (i.e. the present-day Netherlands, Belgium, Luxembourg, and most of the modern French départements of Nord and Pas-de-Calais) from 1482 to 1581. The northern Low Countries began growing from 1200 AD, with the drainage and flood control of land, which could then be cultivated. The population rose and the region of Holland became important. Before that, the development of large cities was in the south, with Ghent, Bruges, Antwerp, Brussels, and Leuven, all of which were larger than any settlement in the north. Rivers in the Low Countries run east–west and were a political and strategic barrier to influence southern influence on the north, forming two separate political areas.

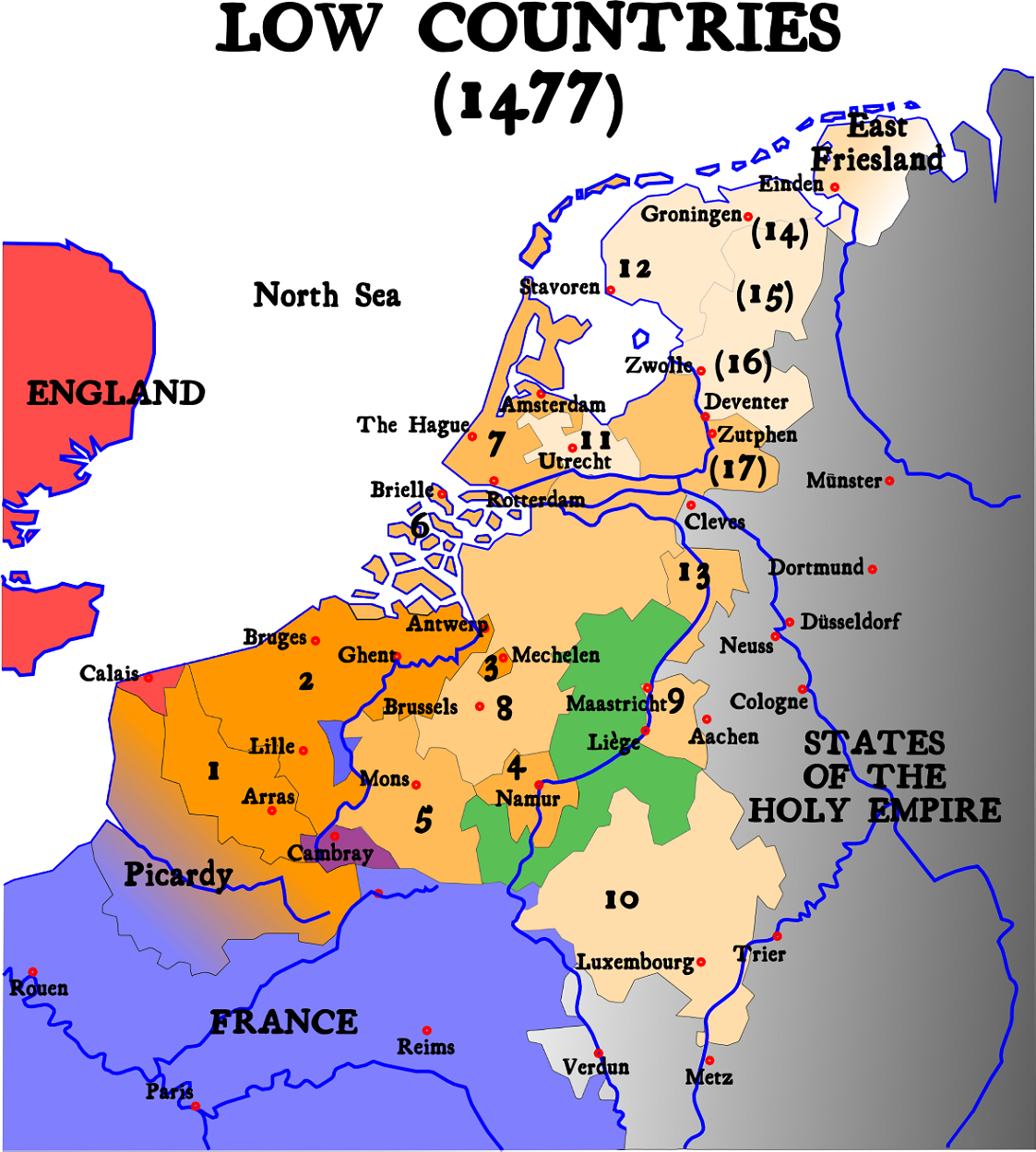
Burgundian Netherlands (orange) upon the death of Charles the Bold

Already under the Holy Roman Empire rule of the Burgundian duke Philip the Good (1419–1467), the provinces of the Netherlands began to grow together, whereas previously they were split with being either the tributary of the French Kingdom or of Burgundy under the Holy Roman Empire banner. The collected fiefdoms were Flanders, Artois and Mechelen, Namur, Holland, Zeeland and Hainaut, Brabant, Limburg, and Luxembourg. These realms were ruled in personal union by the Valois-Burgundy monarchs and represented in the States-General assembly. The centre of the Burgundian possessions was the Duchy of Brabant, where the Burgundian dukes held court in Brussels.

Philip's son Duke Charles the Bold (1467–1477) also acquired Guelders and Zutphen, and even hoped to gain the title of "King" from Habsburg emperor Frederick III by marrying his daughter Mary to Frederick's son Maximilian. Disappointed in this, he engaged in the disastrous Burgundian Wars and was killed in the Battle of Nancy.

History of the Low Countries (schematic)
Frisii		Germanic tribes		Belgae & Celts			
Frisii	Cana– nefates (Note: Roman foederati)	Chamavi, Tubantes (Note: The Chamavi merged into the confederation of the Franks; the Tubantes merged into the confederation of the Saxons.)		Gallia Belgica (55 BC–c. 5th century AD); Germania Inferior (83–c. 5th century)			
Frisii	Cana– nefates	Salian Franks		Batavi			
unpopulated (4th –c. 5th centuries)		Saxons	Salian Franks (4th–c. 5th centuries)				
Frisian Kingdom (c. 6th century – 734)		Saxons	Frankish Kingdom (481–843)—Carolingian Empire (800–843)				
Frisian Kingdom (c. 6th century – 734)		Austrasia (511–687)					
Middle Francia (843–855)				West; Francia (from 843)	Middle Francia (843–855)		
Kingdom of Lotharingia (Note: Part of East Francia after 939, divided in Upper Lorraine (as part of West Francia) and Lower Lorraine (as part of East Francia) in 959.) (855–959); Duchy of Lower Lorraine (Note: Lower Lorraine—also referred to as Lothier—disintegrated into several smaller independent territories and only the title of a "Duke of Lothier" remained, held by Brabant.) (from 959)			Kingdom of Lotharingia (855–959); Duchy of Lower Lorraine (from 959)	West; Francia (from 843)	Kingdom of Lotharingia (855–959); Duchy of Lower Lorraine (from 959)		
Frisia			Kingdom of Lotharingia (855–959); Duchy of Lower Lorraine (from 959)	County of Flanders (Note: Including County of Artois (part of Flanders until 1237) and Tournaisis.) (862–1384)	Kingdom of Lotharingia (855–959); Duchy of Lower Lorraine (from 959)		
Frisian; Freedom (Note: Lordship of Frisia and Lordship of Groningen (including the Ommelanden) after 1524 and 1536 respectively.) (11th–16th centuries)	County of Holland (Note: Including County of Zeeland, that was ruled by neighboring County of Holland and County of Flanders (until 1432).) (880–1432)	Bishopric of Utrecht (Note: Utrecht included Lordship of Overijssel (until 1528), County of Drenthe (until 1528) and County of Zutphen (until 1182).) (695–1456)	Duchy of Brabant (Note: Duchy of Brabant included since 1288 also the Duchy of Limburg (now part of Belgium's Liège Province) and the "Overmaas" lands Dalhem, Valkenburg and Herzogenrath (now part of the Dutch Province of Limburg).) (1183–1430) Duchy of Guelders (Note: The county, later duchy, of Guelders consisted of four quarters, as they were separated by rivers: situated upstream Upper Quarter (the present day northern half of the Dutch province of Limburg), spatially separated from the three downstream Lower Quarters: County of Zutphen (after 1182), Veluwe Quarter and Nijmegen Quarter. The three lower quarters emerged from the historic gau Hamaland (named after the Chamavi tribe), and formed the present day province of Gelderland. Guelders did not include the Cleves enclave Huissen and the independent counties of Buren and Culemborg, that were much later seceded to the province of Gelderland.) (1046–1543)	County of Flanders (862–1384)	County of Hainaut (1071–1432) County of Namur (981–1421)	Prince- Bishopric of Liège (Note: Throughout the Middle Ages, the bishopric was further expanded with the Duchy of Bouillon in 1096 (ceded to France in 1678), the acquisition of the county of Loon in 1366 and the county of Horne in 1568. The Lordship of Mechelen was also part of the Prince-Bishopric of Liège.)(980–1791)	Duchy of Luxembourg (1059–1443)
Frisian; Freedom (11th–16th centuries)	Burgundian Netherlands (1384–1482)					Prince- Bishopric of Liège (980–1791)	Burgundian Netherlands (1384–1482)
Habsburg Netherlands (1482–1795) (Seventeen Provinces after 1543) (Note: The name Seventeen Provinces came in use after the Habsburg emperor Charles V had re-acquired the Duchy of Guelders, and an continuous territory arose.)						Prince- Bishopric of Liège (980–1791)	Habsburg Netherlands (1482–1795) (Seventeen Provinces after 1543)
Dutch Republic (1581–1795)				Spanish Netherlands (1556–1714)		Prince- Bishopric of Liège (980–1791)	Spanish Netherlands (1556–1714)
Dutch Republic (1581–1795)				Austrian Netherlands (1714–1795)		Prince- Bishopric of Liège (980–1791)	Austrian Netherlands (1714–1795)
Dutch Republic (1581–1795)				United States of Belgium (1790)		Republic of Liège (1789–'91)	United States of Belgium (1790)
Dutch Republic (1581–1795)				Austrian Netherlands (1795–1797)		P.-Bish. of Liège (1791–1794)	Austrian Netherlands (1795–1797)
Batavian Republic (1795–1806); Kingdom of Holland (1806–1810)			associated with French First Republic (1795–1804) part of First French Empire (1804–1815)				
part of First French Empire (1810–1813)			associated with French First Republic (1795–1804) part of First French Empire (1804–1815)				
Sovereign Principality of the Netherlands (1813–1815)			associated with French First Republic (1795–1804) part of First French Empire (1804–1815)				
United Kingdom of the Netherlands (1815–1830)							Grand Duchy of Luxembourg (from 1815)
Kingdom of the Netherlands (from 1839)				Kingdom of Belgium (from 1830)			Grand Duchy of Luxembourg (from 1815)
Kingdom of the Netherlands (from 1839)				Kingdom of Belgium (from 1830)			Grand Duchy of Luxembourg (from 1890)

== History ==
Map showing the formation of the Habsburg Netherlands between 1482 and 1543

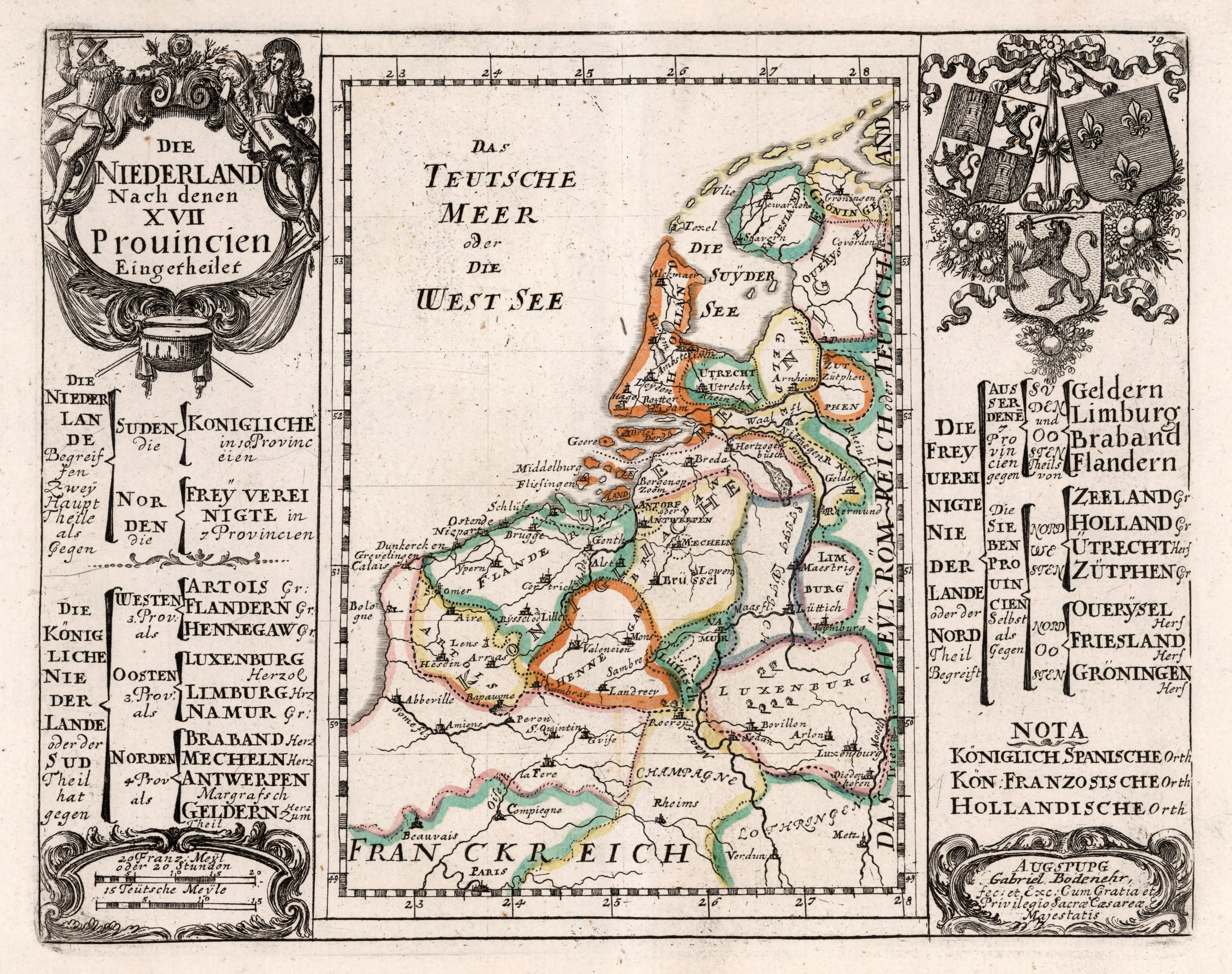
Map of the Seventeen Provinces by Gabriel Bodenehr

Upon the death of Mary of Burgundy in 1482, her substantial possessions including the Burgundian Netherlands passed to her son, Philip the Handsome, who married Joanna of Castile, daughter of Isabel I of Castile and Ferdinand II of Aragon. Through his father Maximilian I, Holy Roman Emperor, Philip was a Habsburg scion, and so the period of the Habsburg Netherlands began. The period 1481–1492 saw the Flemish cities revolt and Utrecht embroiled in civil war, but by the turn of the century both areas had been pacified by the Habsburg rulers.

Philip's son Charles, born in Ghent, succeeded his father as Duke in 1506, when he was six years old. His paternal grandfather, Emperor Maximilian I, incorporated the Burgundian heritage into the Burgundian Circle, whereafter the territories in the far west of the Empire developed a certain grade of autonomy. Through his mother Joanna, who had a mental breakdown following the death of her husband, he was heir to the Spanish kingdoms of Castile and Aragon and Spain's overseas empire in the New World. Attaining full age in 1515, Charles went on to rule his Burgundian heritage as a native Netherlander. He acquired the lands of Overijssel and the Bishopric of Utrecht (see Guelders Wars), purchased Friesland from Duke George of Saxony and regained Groningen and Gelderland.

In 1516, Charles became the king of Spain, but also continued to rule over his domains in the Netherlands and Burgundy, thus creating a personal bond between those regions and Spain, but without annexation, since all of those regions remained within the Holy Roman Empire. His Seventeen Provinces were re-organised in the Burgundian treaty of 1548, whereby the Imperial estates represented in the Imperial Diet at Augsburg acknowledged a certain autonomy of the Netherlands. It was followed by the Emperor's Pragmatic Sanction of 1549, which established the Seventeen Provinces as an entity held by a single prince.

=== Spanish Netherlands ===
Following a series of abdications between 1555 and 1556, Charles V divided the House of Habsburg into an Austrian-German and a Spanish branch. His brother Ferdinand I became suo jure monarch in Austria, Bohemia and Hungary, as well as the new Holy Roman Emperor. Philip II of Spain, Charles' son, inherited the Seventeen Provinces and incorporated them into the Spanish Crown (which included also Southern Italy and the American possessions). King Philip II of Spain became infamous for his despotism, and Catholic persecutions sparked the Dutch Revolt and the subsequent Eighty Years' War. The Spanish hold on the northern provinces was more and more tenuous. In 1579 the northern provinces established the Protestant Union of Utrecht, in which they declared themselves independent as the Seven United Provinces by the 1581 Act of Abjuration.

After the secession of 1581, the southern provinces, called "'t Hof van Brabant" (of Flandria, Artois, the Tournaisis, Cambrai, Luxembourg, Limburg, Hainaut, Namur, Mechelen, Brabant, and Upper Guelders) remained with the Spanish Habsburgs. In 1598, king Philip II of Spain ceded Spanish Netherlands, and the Free County of Burgundy, to his daughter Isabella Clara Eugenia, who ruled as sovereign of those lands, jointly with her husband Archduke Albert VII of Austria. After Albert's death in 1621, those regions were returned to the Spanish Habsburgs, and Isabella continued to rule as governess of the Spanish Netherlands until her death in 1633, under the sovereignty of her nephew, king Philip IV of Spain.

=== Austrian Netherlands ===
Austrian Netherlands in 1789

After the extinction of the Spanish Habsburg line in 1700 with the death of the childless Charles II and the War of the Spanish Succession (1700–14), the southern provinces came to Austrian Habsburgs, in person of emperor's Leopold I younger son Charles, and were known as the Austrian Netherlands. In 1784, following the War of the Bavarian Succession (1777-1779), emperor Joseph II proposed to the new Bavarian prince-elector Charles Theodore to exchange Bavaria for the Austrian Netherlands, offering him the title "King of Burgundy", but the proposal was not accepted, and thus the plan failed. During the French Revolutionary Wars, Austrian Netherlands was invaded by Revolutionary France and annexed after the Battle of Sprimont in 1794, that was followed by the Peace of Basel in 1795. Austria relinquished all of its claims on the province in 1797 through the Treaty of Campo Formio.

== Rulers ==
- 1482–1506 Philip the Handsome, with his father Maximilian I as regent (1482–1493), and his stepgrandmother Margaret of York as governess (1489–1493)
- 1506–1556 Charles V, Holy Roman Emperor, with his grandfather Maximilian I as regent until 1515
- 1556–1598 Philip II of Spain
- 1598-1621 Isabella Clara Eugenia and Archduke Albert VII
- 1621–1665 Philip IV of Spain
- 1665–1700 Charles II of Spain
- 1700–1740 Charles VI, Holy Roman Emperor
- 1740–1780 Maria Theresa
- 1780–1790 Joseph II, Holy Roman Emperor
- 1790–1792 Leopold II, Holy Roman Emperor
- 1792–1797 Franz II, Holy Roman Emperor

The provinces were ruled on their behalf by a governor (stadtholder or landvoogd):

- 1489–1493 Margaret of York, dowager Duchess of Burgundy
- 1506–1507 William de Croÿ, Marquis d'Aerschot
- 1507–1530 Margaret of Austria, Duchess of Savoy
- 1531–1555 Mary of Hungary
- 1555–1559 Emmanuel Philibert, Duke of Savoy
- 1559–1567 Margaret of Parma
- 1567–1573 Fernando Álvarez de Toledo, 3rd Duke of Alba
- 1573–1576 Luis de Requesens y Zúñiga
- 1576–1578 John of Austria
- 1578–1592 Alexander Farnese, Duke of Parma. In 1578, the Dutch insurgents appointed Archduke Matthias of Austria governor, though he could not prevail and resigned before the 1581 Act of Abjuration.
- 1685–1692 Francisco Antonio de Agurto Salcedo Medrano Zúñiga

== Flag ==
The flags of the Habsburg Netherlands

Flag of Spanish Netherlands (1556–1714)

Flag used by the Austrian Netherlands (1714–1797)

During the Spanish period it is assumed that the flag was the Cross of Burgundy. After a period of turmoil with the Eighty Years' War, by 1713 the Southern Netherlands were separated from Spain and attached to Austria, assuming a flag consisting of three equal horizontal bands displaying the colours of red, white and gold. A small cross of Burgundy was present, which in 1781 was covered by a black double-headed eagle.

== See also ==
- Spanish Netherlands
- Austrian Netherlands
- Treaty of Arras (1482)
- Treaty of Senlis (1493)

== Literature ==
- Anderson, Matthew S. (2000) [1961]. Europe in the eighteenth century, 1713-1789. General history of Europe (4 ed.). Taylor & Francis.
- Parker, Geoffrey (2019). Emperor: A New Life of Charles V. New Haven and London: Yale University Press.
