= Low Countries =

Coastal lowland region in northwestern Europe

The Low Countries

Netherlands

Belgium

Luxembourg

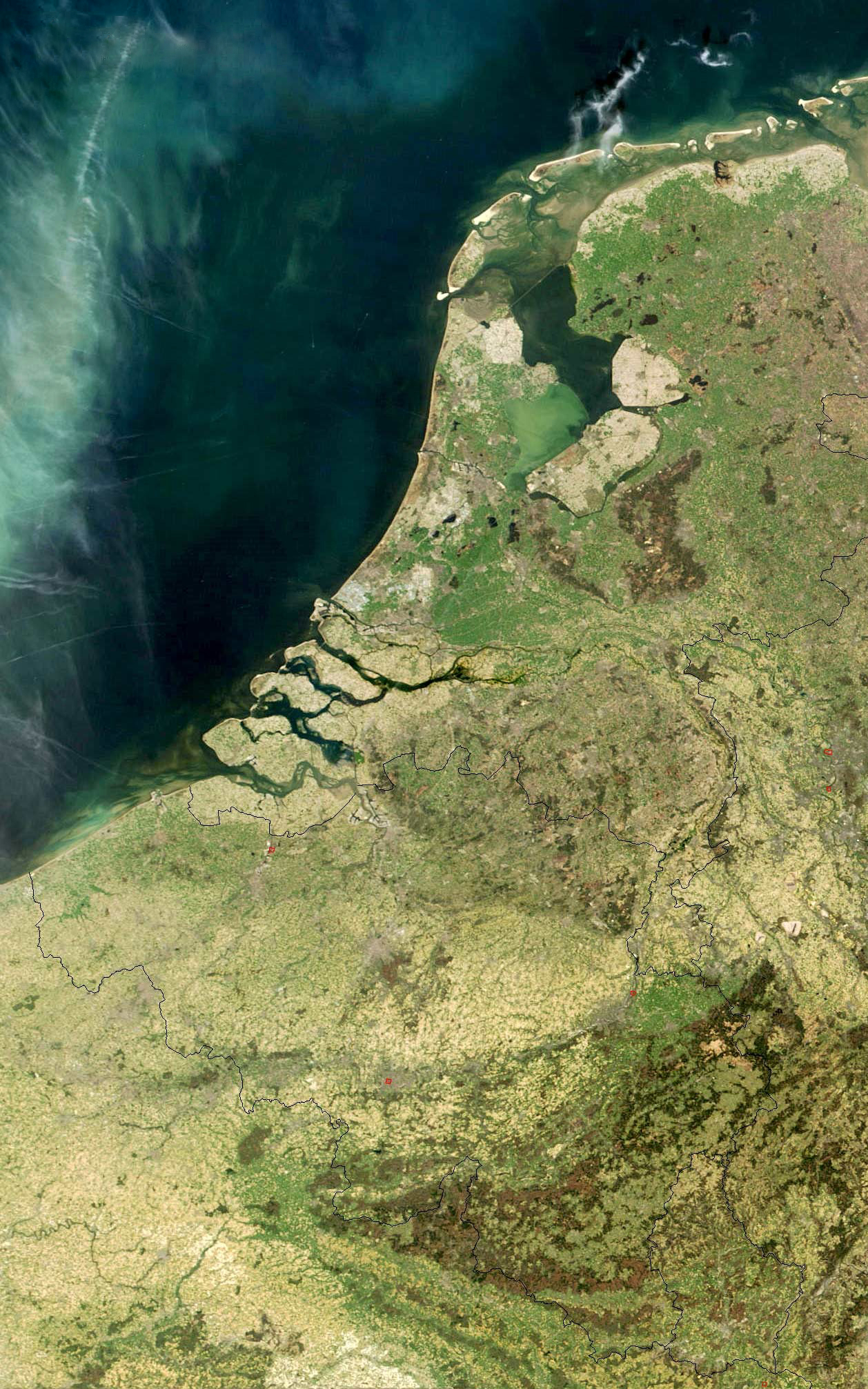
The Low Countries as seen from NASA space satellite

The Low Countries (Note: Dutch: de Nederlanden or de Lage Landen; French: les Pays-Bas or les Plats-Pays; West Frisian: de Nederlannen or de Lege Lannen; Luxembourgish: d'Nidderlanden; German: die Niederlande), historically also known as the Netherlands.) is a historical and geographically coastal lowland region in Northwestern Europe forming the lower basin of the Rhine–Meuse–Scheldt delta and consisting today of the three modern "Benelux" countries: Belgium, the Netherlands, and Luxembourg. Also sometimes included are parts of France (such as Nord and Pas-de-Calais) and the German regions of East Frisia, Guelders and Cleves. Since the creation of the Holy Roman Empire, the region has been divided into numerous different entities.

Historically, the regions without access to the sea linked themselves politically and economically to those with access to form various unions of ports and hinterland, stretching inland as far as parts of the German Rhineland. Not only physically-low-altitude areas but also some hilly or elevated regions are now therefore considered part of the Low Countries, including Luxembourg and southern Belgium. Within the European Union, the region's political grouping is still referred to as the Benelux (short for Belgium-Netherlands-Luxembourg).

During the Roman Empire, the region contained a militarised frontier and contact point with the Germanic tribes. The Low Countries were the scene of the early independent trading centres that marked the reawakening of Europe in the 12th century. In that period, they rivalled northern Italy as one of the most densely populated regions of Western Europe. Guilds and councils governed most of the cities along with a figurehead ruler; interaction with their ruler was regulated by a strict set of rules describing what the latter could and could not expect. All of the regions depended mainly on trade, manufacturing and the encouragement of the free flow of goods and craftsmen. Dutch and French dialects were the main languages used in secular city life.

== Terminology ==
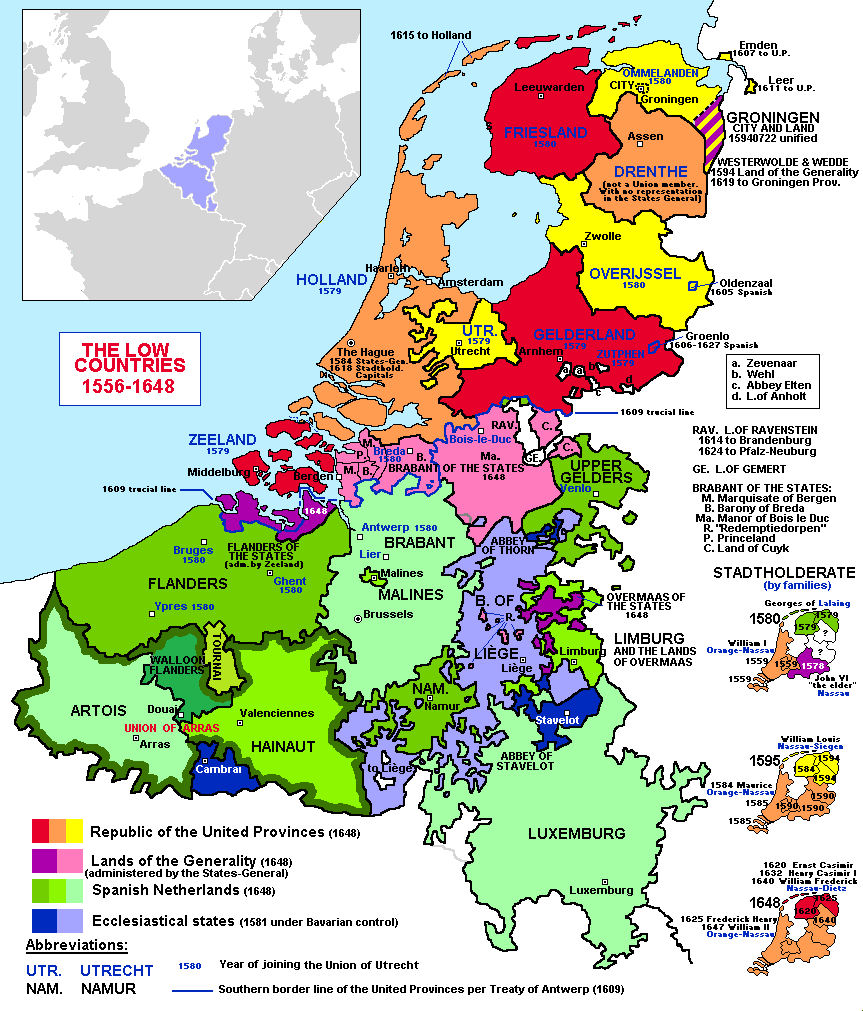
The Low Countries from 1556 to 1648

Southern part of the Low Countries with bishopry towns and abbeys c. 7th century

Historically, the term Low Countries arose at the Court of the Dukes of Burgundy, who used the term les pays de par deçà ("the lands over here") for the Low Countries as opposed to les pays de par delà ("the lands over there") for the Duchy of Burgundy and the Free County of Burgundy, which were part of their realm but geographically disconnected from the Low Countries. Governor Mary of Hungary used both the expressions les pays de par deça and Pays d'Embas ("lands down here"), which evolved to Pays-Bas or Low Countries. Today the term is typically fitted to modern political boundaries and used in the same way as the term Benelux.

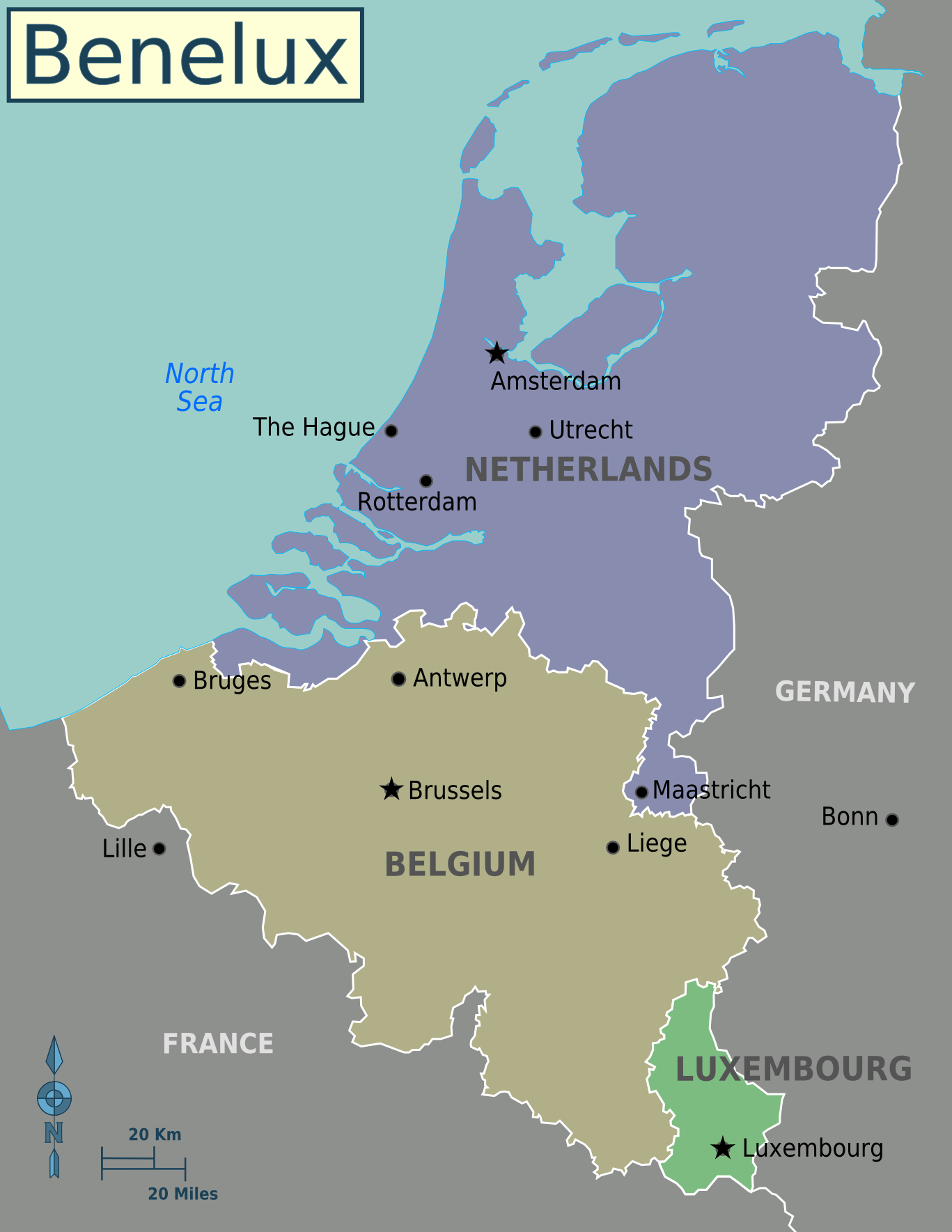
Belgium, the Netherlands and Luxembourg form the Benelux

The Netherlands is a country whose name has the same etymology and origin as the name for the region Low Countries since "nether" means "low". In the Dutch language, De Lage Landen is the modern term for Low Countries, De Nederlanden (plural) is in use for the 16th-century domains of Charles V, the historic Low Countries, and Nederland (singular) is the normal Dutch name for the country of the Netherlands. However, in official use, the name of the kingdom is still the Kingdom of the Netherlands Koninkrijk der Nederlanden (plural). The name derives from the 19th-century origins of the kingdom, which originally included present-day Belgium.

In Dutch and to a lesser extent English, the Low Countries colloquially means the Netherlands and Belgium or sometimes the Netherlands and Flanders, the Flemish-speaking north of Belgium. For example, a Low Countries derby (Derby der Lage Landen) is a sports event between Belgium and the Netherlands.

Belgium separated in 1830 from the (northern) Netherlands. The new country took its name from Belgica, the Latinised name for the Low Countries, as it was known during the Eighty Years' War (1568–1648). The Low Countries were in that war divided in two parts. On one hand, the northern Federated Netherlands, or Belgica Foederata, rebelled against King Philip II of Spain; on the other hand, the southern Royal Netherlands, or Belgica Regia, remained loyal to the Spanish king. The division laid the early foundation for today's states of Belgium and the Netherlands.

== History ==
History of the Low Countries (schematic)
Frisii		Germanic tribes		Belgae & Celts			
Frisii	Cana– nefates (Note: Roman foederati)	Chamavi, Tubantes (Note: The Chamavi merged into the confederation of the Franks; the Tubantes merged into the confederation of the Saxons.)		Gallia Belgica (55 BC–c. 5th century AD); Germania Inferior (83–c. 5th century)			
Frisii	Cana– nefates	Salian Franks		Batavi			
unpopulated (4th –c. 5th centuries)		Saxons	Salian Franks (4th–c. 5th centuries)				
Frisian Kingdom (c. 6th century – 734)		Saxons	Frankish Kingdom (481–843)—Carolingian Empire (800–843)				
Frisian Kingdom (c. 6th century – 734)		Austrasia (511–687)					
Middle Francia (843–855)				West; Francia (from 843)	Middle Francia (843–855)		
Kingdom of Lotharingia (Note: Part of East Francia after 939, divided in Upper Lorraine (as part of West Francia) and Lower Lorraine (as part of East Francia) in 959.) (855–959); Duchy of Lower Lorraine (Note: Lower Lorraine—also referred to as Lothier—disintegrated into several smaller independent territories and only the title of a "Duke of Lothier" remained, held by Brabant.) (from 959)			Kingdom of Lotharingia (855–959); Duchy of Lower Lorraine (from 959)	West; Francia (from 843)	Kingdom of Lotharingia (855–959); Duchy of Lower Lorraine (from 959)		
Frisia			Kingdom of Lotharingia (855–959); Duchy of Lower Lorraine (from 959)	County of Flanders (Note: Including County of Artois (part of Flanders until 1237) and Tournaisis.) (862–1384)	Kingdom of Lotharingia (855–959); Duchy of Lower Lorraine (from 959)		
Frisian; Freedom (Note: Lordship of Frisia and Lordship of Groningen (including the Ommelanden) after 1524 and 1536 respectively.) (11th–16th centuries)	County of Holland (Note: Including County of Zeeland, that was ruled by neighboring County of Holland and County of Flanders (until 1432).) (880–1432)	Bishopric of Utrecht (Note: Utrecht included Lordship of Overijssel (until 1528), County of Drenthe (until 1528) and County of Zutphen (until 1182).) (695–1456)	Duchy of Brabant (Note: Duchy of Brabant included since 1288 also the Duchy of Limburg (now part of Belgium's Liège Province) and the "Overmaas" lands Dalhem, Valkenburg and Herzogenrath (now part of the Dutch Province of Limburg).) (1183–1430) Duchy of Guelders (Note: The county, later duchy, of Guelders consisted of four quarters, as they were separated by rivers: situated upstream Upper Quarter (the present day northern half of the Dutch province of Limburg), spatially separated from the three downstream Lower Quarters: County of Zutphen (after 1182), Veluwe Quarter and Nijmegen Quarter. The three lower quarters emerged from the historic gau Hamaland (named after the Chamavi tribe), and formed the present day province of Gelderland. Guelders did not include the Cleves enclave Huissen and the independent counties of Buren and Culemborg, that were much later seceded to the province of Gelderland.) (1046–1543)	County of Flanders (862–1384)	County of Hainaut (1071–1432) County of Namur (981–1421)	Prince- Bishopric of Liège (Note: Throughout the Middle Ages, the bishopric was further expanded with the Duchy of Bouillon in 1096 (ceded to France in 1678), the acquisition of the county of Loon in 1366 and the county of Horne in 1568. The Lordship of Mechelen was also part of the Prince-Bishopric of Liège.)(980–1791)	Duchy of Luxembourg (1059–1443)
Frisian; Freedom (11th–16th centuries)	Burgundian Netherlands (1384–1482)					Prince- Bishopric of Liège (980–1791)	Burgundian Netherlands (1384–1482)
Habsburg Netherlands (1482–1795) (Seventeen Provinces after 1543) (Note: The name Seventeen Provinces came in use after the Habsburg emperor Charles V had re-acquired the Duchy of Guelders, and an continuous territory arose.)						Prince- Bishopric of Liège (980–1791)	Habsburg Netherlands (1482–1795) (Seventeen Provinces after 1543)
Dutch Republic (1581–1795)				Spanish Netherlands (1556–1714)		Prince- Bishopric of Liège (980–1791)	Spanish Netherlands (1556–1714)
Dutch Republic (1581–1795)				Austrian Netherlands (1714–1795)		Prince- Bishopric of Liège (980–1791)	Austrian Netherlands (1714–1795)
Dutch Republic (1581–1795)				United States of Belgium (1790)		Republic of Liège (1789–'91)	United States of Belgium (1790)
Dutch Republic (1581–1795)				Austrian Netherlands (1795–1797)		P.-Bish. of Liège (1791–1794)	Austrian Netherlands (1795–1797)
Batavian Republic (1795–1806); Kingdom of Holland (1806–1810)			associated with French First Republic (1795–1804) part of First French Empire (1804–1815)				
part of First French Empire (1810–1813)			associated with French First Republic (1795–1804) part of First French Empire (1804–1815)				
Sovereign Principality of the Netherlands (1813–1815)			associated with French First Republic (1795–1804) part of First French Empire (1804–1815)				
United Kingdom of the Netherlands (1815–1830)							Grand Duchy of Luxembourg (from 1815)
Kingdom of the Netherlands (from 1839)				Kingdom of Belgium (from 1830)			Grand Duchy of Luxembourg (from 1815)
Kingdom of the Netherlands (from 1839)				Kingdom of Belgium (from 1830)			Grand Duchy of Luxembourg (from 1890)

The region politically had its origins in the Carolingian Empire; more precisely, most of the people were within the Duchy of Lower Lotharingia. After the disintegration of Lower Lotharingia, the Low Countries were brought under the rule of various lordships until they came to be in the hands of the Valois Dukes of Burgundy. Hence, a large part of the Low Countries came to be referred to as the Burgundian Netherlands. After the reign of the Valois Dukes ended, much of the region was controlled by the House of Habsburg. The area was referred to as the Habsburg Netherlands, which was also called the Seventeen Provinces up to 1581. Even after the political secession of the autonomous Dutch Republic (or "United Provinces") in the north, the term "Low Countries" continued to be used to refer collectively to the region. The region was temporarily united politically between 1815 and 1839, as the United Kingdom of the Netherlands, which later became three countries: the Netherlands, Belgium and Luxembourg.

=== Early history ===
The Low Countries were part of the Roman provinces of Gallia Belgica and Germania Inferior. They were inhabited by Belgic and Germanic tribes. In the 4th and 5th century, Frankish tribes had entered this Roman region and came to run it increasingly independently. They came to be ruled by the Merovingian dynasty, under which dynasty the southern part (below the Rhine) was re-Christianised.

=== Frankish Empire ===
By the late 8th century, the Low Countries formed a core part of a much-expanded Francia, and the Merovingians were replaced by the Carolingian dynasty. In 800, the Pope crowned and appointed Charlemagne Emperor of the re-established Roman Empire.

After the death of Emperor Louis the Pious, Francia was divided in three parts among his three sons. The middle part, Middle Francia, was ruled by Lothair I and thereby also came to be referred to as "Lotharingia" or "Lorraine". Apart from the original coastal County of Flanders, which was within West Francia, the rest of the Low Countries were within it as lowland part, "Lower Lorraine".

After the death of Lothair, the Low Countries were coveted by the rulers of both West Francia and East Francia. Each tried to swallow the region and to merge it with their spheres of influence. Thus, the Low Countries consisted of fiefs, whose sovereignty resided with either the Kingdom of France or the Holy Roman Empire. While the further history the Low Countries can be seen as the object of a continual struggle between both powers, the title of Duke of Lothier was coveted in the Low Countries for centuries.

=== Duchy of Burgundy ===
In the 14th and the 15th centuries, separate fiefs came gradually to be ruled by a single family through royal intermarriage. The process culminated in the rule of the House of Valois, who were the rulers of the Duchy of Burgundy. At the height of Burgundian influence, the Low Countries became the political, cultural and economic centre of Northern Europe and was noted for its crafts and luxury goods, notably Early Netherlandish painting, the work of artists who were active in the flourishing cities of Bruges, Ghent, Mechelen, Leuven, Tournai and Brussels, all of which are in present-day Belgium. Musicians of the Franco-Flemish School were highly sought by the leading classes of all of Europe.

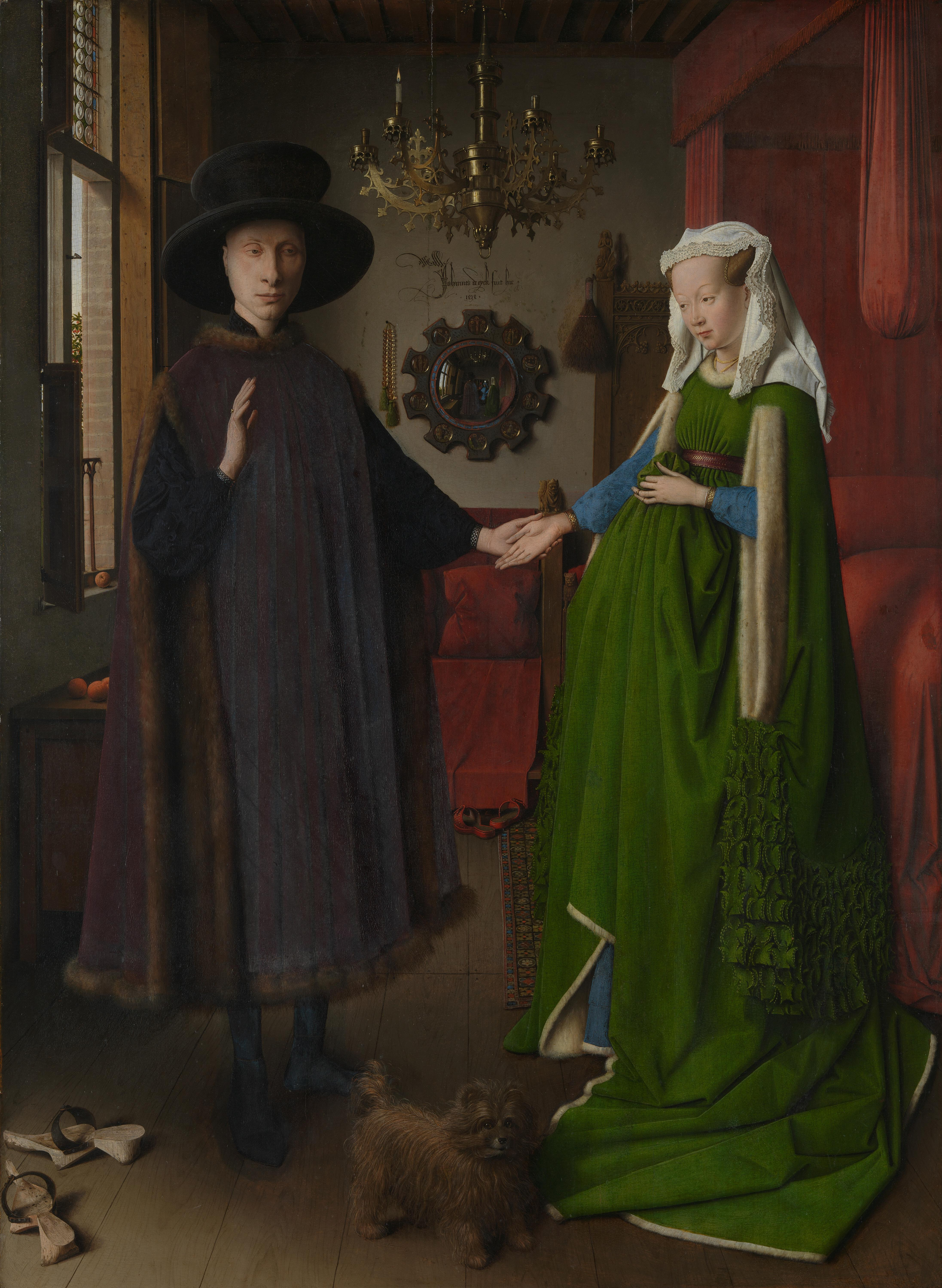
Jan van Eyck, The Arnolfini Portrait, 1434, National Gallery, London

=== Seventeen Provinces ===
In 1477, the Burgundian holdings in the area passed through an heiress, Mary of Burgundy, to the Habsburgs. Charles V, who inherited the territory in 1506, was named ruler by the States General and styled himself as Heer der Nederlanden (lit. 'Lord of the Netherlands'). He continued to rule the territories as a multitude of duchies and principalities until the Low Countries were eventually united into one indivisible territory, the Seventeen Provinces, covered by the Pragmatic Sanction of 1549 and retaining existing customs, laws and forms of government within the provinces.

The Pragmatic Sanction transformed the agglomeration of lands into a unified entity of which the Habsburgs would be the heirs. By streamlining the succession law in all Seventeen Provinces and declaring that all of them would be inherited by one heir, Charles effectively united the Netherlands as one entity. After Charles' abdication in 1555, the Seventeen Provinces passed to his son, Philip II of Spain.

=== Division ===
The Pragmatic Sanction is said to be one example of the Habsburg contest with particularism, which contributed to the Dutch Revolt. Each of the provinces had its own laws, customs and political practices. The new policy, imposed from the outside, angered many inhabitants, who viewed their provinces as distinct entities. It and other monarchical acts, such as the creation of bishoprics and promulgation of laws against heresy, stoked resentments, which fired the eruption of the Dutch Revolt.

After the northern Seven United Provinces declared their independence from Habsburg Spain in 1581, the ten provinces of the Southern Netherlands remained occupied by the Army of Flanders under Spanish service and so became sometimes called the Spanish Netherlands. In 1713, under the Treaty of Utrecht after the War of the Spanish Succession, what was left of the Spanish Netherlands was ceded to Austria and thus became known as the Austrian Netherlands.

Some states like the Bouillon, Cambrésis, East Frisia, Liège and Stavelot-Malmedy did not become part of the wider policies and remained at least nominally independent. Liège was excluded from the Burgundian Circle, was instead incorporated into the Lower Rhenish–Westphalian Circle and later become regularly part of a personal union with bishoprics like the Electorate of Cologne under the Wittelsbach dynasty.

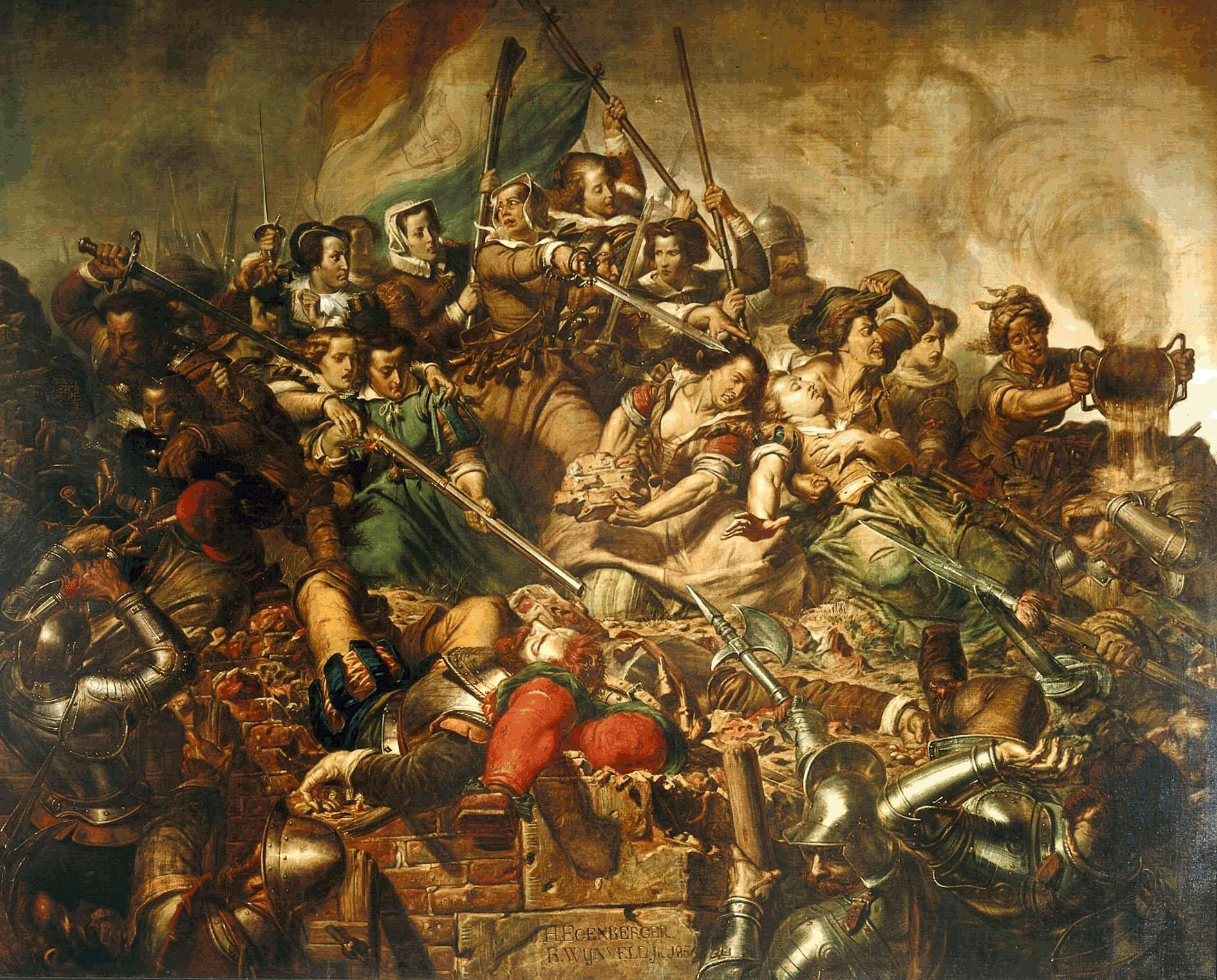
Kenau Simonsdochter Hasselaer defending the walls during the Siege of Haarlem (1572–1573)

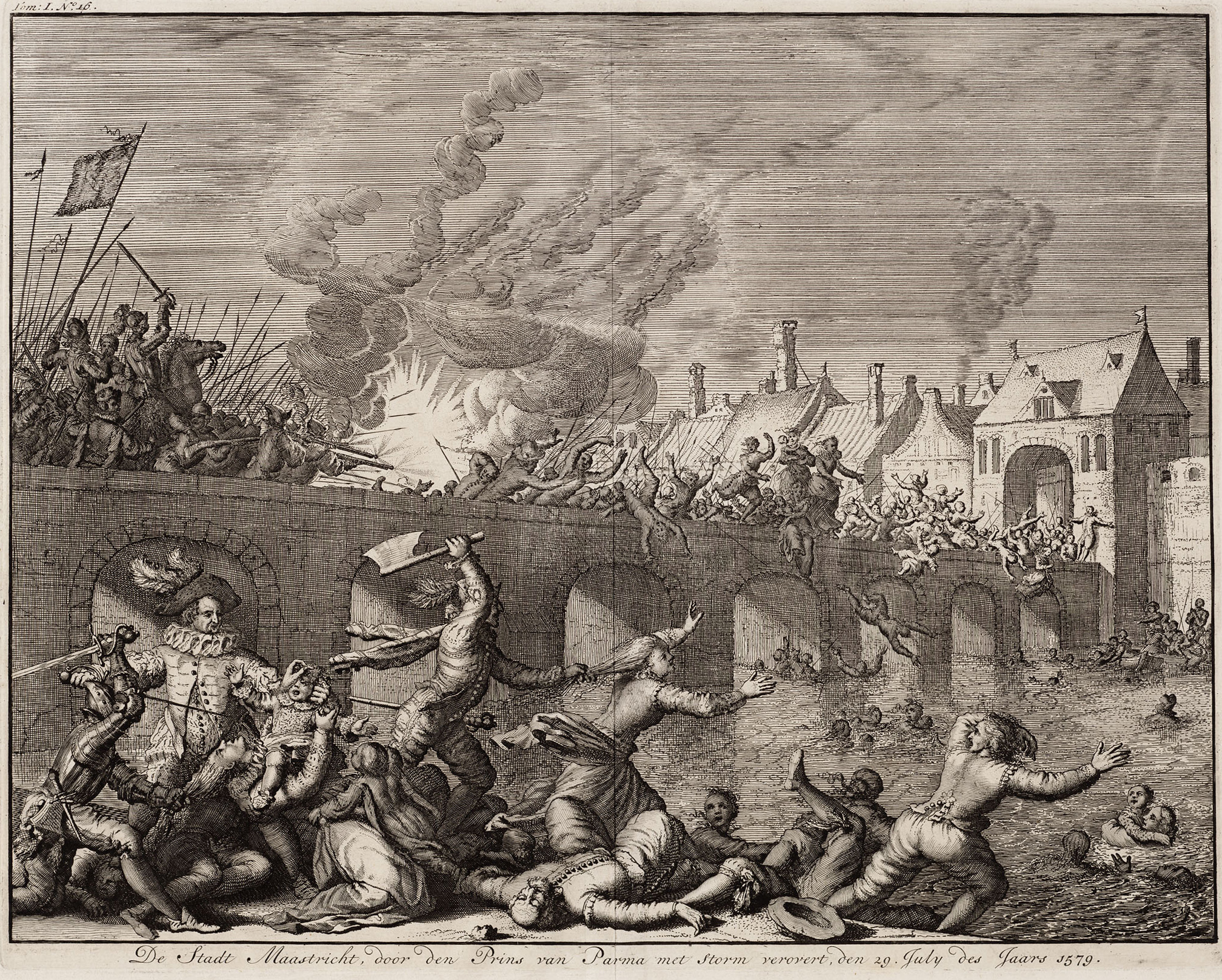
Sack of Maastricht by the Tercios de Flandes (Flemish Regiments) in 1579

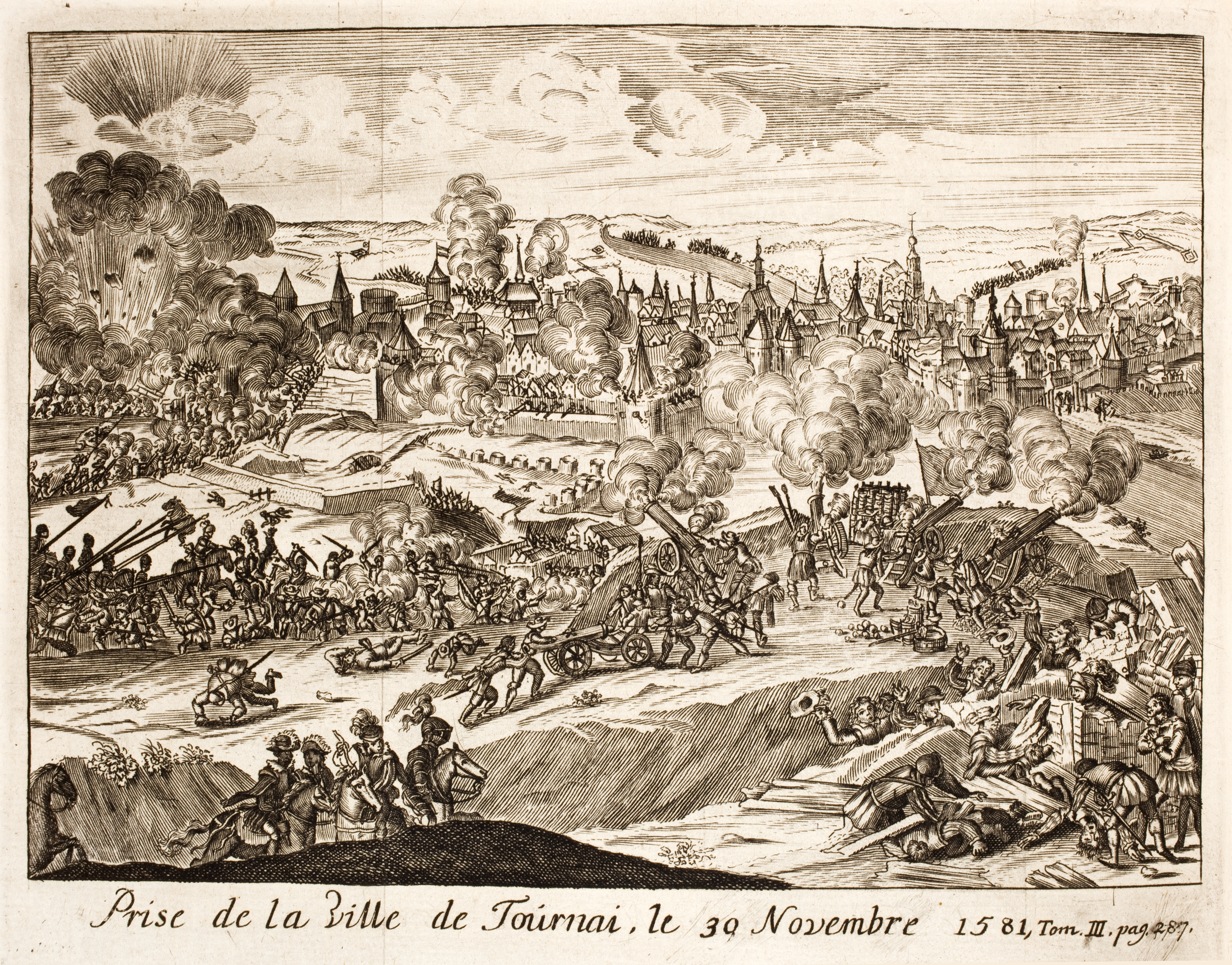
Siege and capture of Tournai (1581)

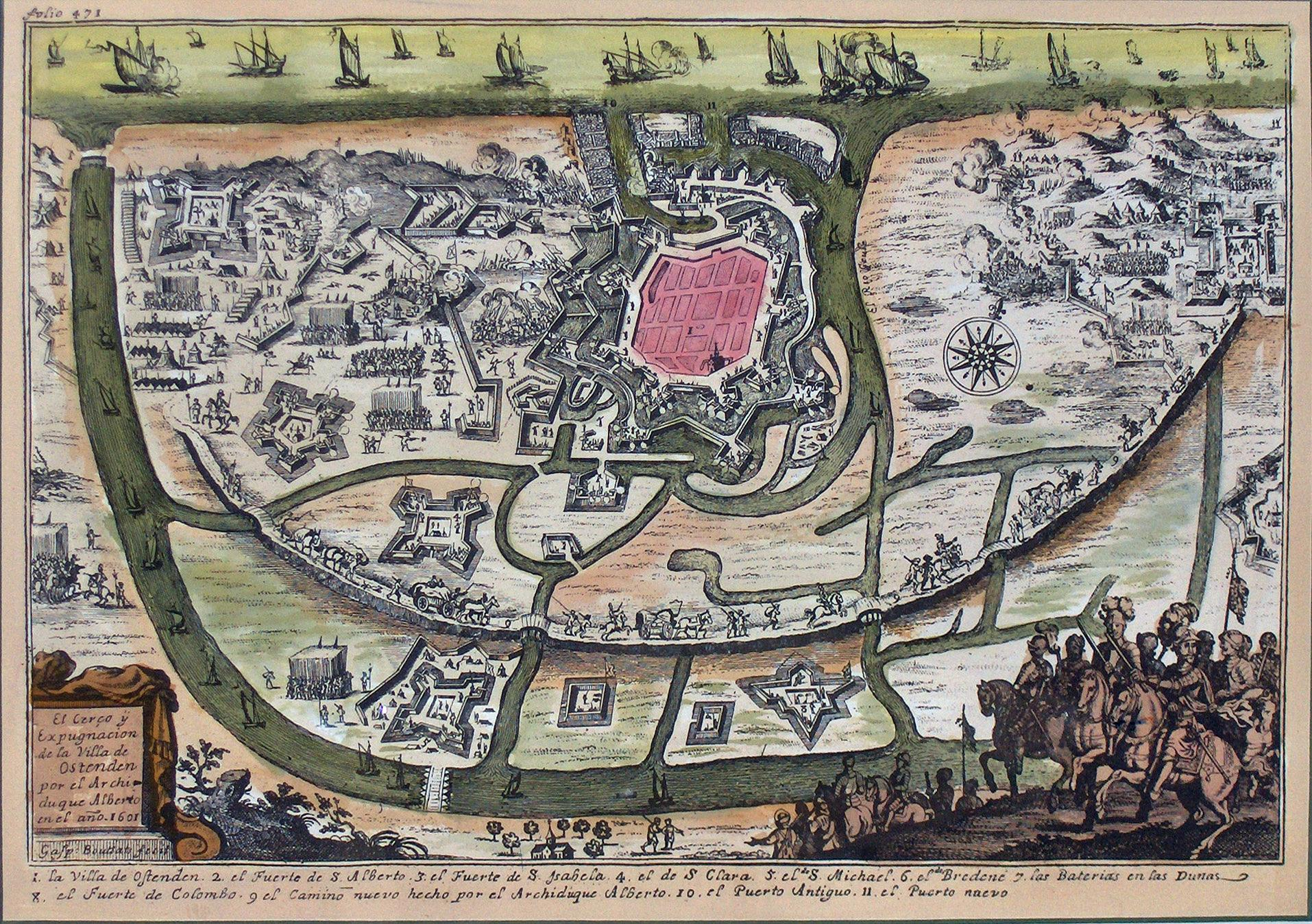
Map of Ostend during the siege in 1601

=== Modern period ===
The United Kingdom of the Netherlands (1815–1830) temporarily united the Low Countries again before it was divided into the three modern countries of the Netherlands, Belgium and Luxembourg.

During the early months of World War I in 1914, the Central Powers invaded the Low Countries of Luxembourg and Belgium in what has been come to be known as the German invasion of Belgium, which led to the German occupation of the two countries. However, the German advance into France was quickly halted, causing a military stalemate for most of the war. In the end, a total of approximately 56,000 people were killed in the invasion.

During World War II, when Adolf Hitler's gaze turned his strategy west toward France, the Low Countries were an easy route around the imposing French Maginot Line. He ordered a conquest of the Low Countries with the shortest possible notice to forestall the French and prevent Allied air power from threatening the strategic Ruhr Area of Germany. It would also provide the basis for a long-term air and sea campaign against Britain. As much as possible of the border areas in northern France should be occupied. Germany's Blitzkrieg tactics rapidly overpowered the defences of Belgium, the Netherlands and Luxembourg.

All three countries were occupied from May 1940 to early 1945. During the occupation, their governments were forced into exile in Britain. In 1944, they signed the London Customs Convention, laying the foundation for the eventual Benelux Economic Union, an important forerunner of the EEC (later the EU).

== Literature ==
One of the Low Countries' earliest literary figures was the blind poet Bernlef, from c. 800, who sang both Christian psalms and pagan verses. Bernlef is representative of the coexistence of Christianity and Germanic polytheism in the time period.

The earliest examples of written literature include the Wachtendonck Psalms, a collection of 25 psalms that originated in the Moselle-Frankish region around the mid- 9th century.

== See also ==
- Burgundian Circle
- Burgundian Netherlands
- Early Netherlandish painting
- Greater Netherlands
- Lower Lorraine
- Pan-Netherlands
- Union of Brussels
