= Lordship of Overijssel =

Feudal dominion of the Netherlands (1528–1798)

Lordship of Overijssel Heerlijkheid Overijssel (Dutch)
- 1528–1798
- Coat of arms

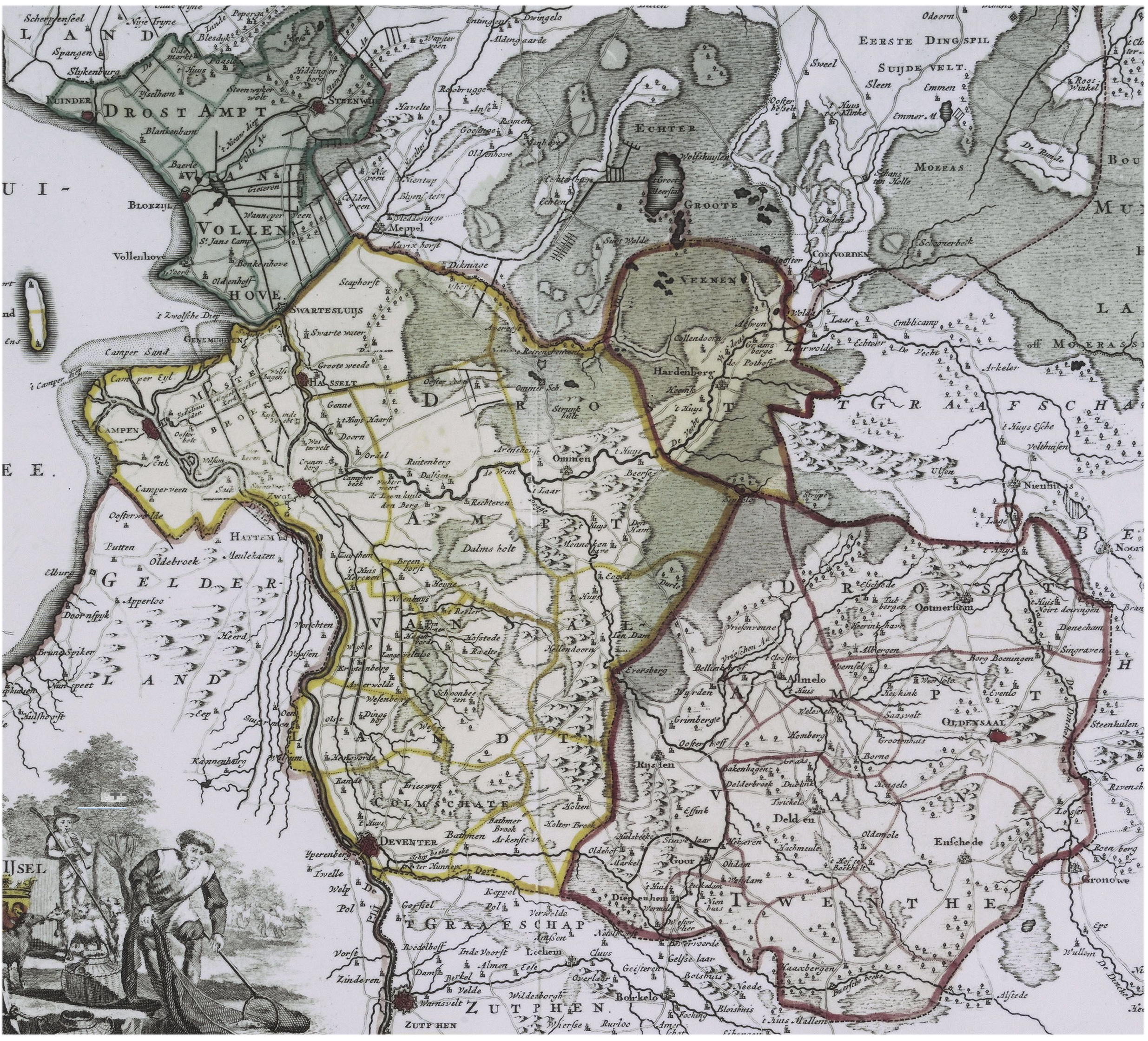
- Lordship of Overijssel, 1757
- Status: State of the Holy Roman Empire; (until 1548); part of the Habsburg Netherlands; (1548–1588); Dutch Republic; (1588–1795); Batavian Republic; (from 1795)
- Common languages: Dutch, West Low German
- Religion: Catholic Church Protestantism
- Government: Feudal monarchy
- Historical era: Middle Ages
  - Established: 1528
  - Disestablished: 1798
Preceded by	Succeeded by
Prince-Bishopric of Utrecht	Batavian Republic

The Lordship of Overijssel or Overissel (Latin: Transisalania) is a former division of the Netherlands named for its position along the river IJssel. It corresponds to the modern-day province of Overijssel.

The lordship was formed in 1528 when Charles V of Habsburg conquered Oversticht (roughly the present-day Province of Overijssel and Province of Drenthe), during the Guelders Wars. Before 1528, this area was part of the Bishopric of Utrecht. In 1528, at the demand of Henry of the Palatinate, Prince-Bishop of Utrecht, Habsburg forces under Georg Schenck van Toutenburg liberated the Bishopric, which had been occupied by the Duchy of Guelders since 1521–1522. On October 20, 1528, Bishop Henry handed over power to Charles of Habsburg. The Bishopric of Utrecht came to an end and was divided into the Lordship of Utrecht and the Lordship of Overijssel, both ruled by a Habsburg Stadtholder. The name Overijssel however is of much earlier date; Oversticht was known since 1233 by its Latin name Transysla or Transisalania, literally: Over-IJssel, i.e. the other side of the river IJssel.

Between 1528 and 1584, the Stadtholder of Overijssel was the same as the Stadtholder of the Lordship of Frisia. The Lordship became part of the Burgundian Circle by the Pragmatic Sanction of 1549 and one of the Seventeen Provinces.

During the Eighty Years' War, Overijssel was divided between 1580–1597 into a Spanish-controlled part in the East (capital: Oldenzaal) and a republican-controlled part in the West. Both had their own stadtholder. By 1597, the Lordship was reunited by the conquests of Maurice of Nassau, Prince of Orange. Oldenzaal was reconquered by the Spanish in 1605, but definitely lost in 1626.

When the Batavian Republic was created in 1795, the Lordship of Overijssel was abolished. After the Napoleonic Wars came to an end Overijssel was recreated as one of the provinces of United Kingdom of the Netherlands.
