= Lordship of Mechelen =

Autonomous Lordship in the Low Countries

Lordship of Mechelen Heerlijkheid Mechelen (Dutch) Seigneurie de Malines (French)
- 910–1795
- The coat of arms of the Lordship of Mechelen: in 1490, the Emperor Frederick III authorized the addition of the eagle.

- The seigneury of Mechelen around Lordship in 1350

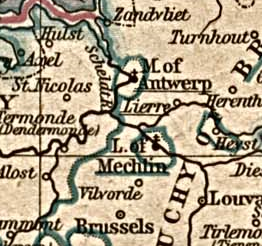
- Map of the area from 1559–1608
- Status: State of the Holy Roman Empire; State of the Seventeen Provinces; Region of the Habsburg Netherlands (1556-1795)
- Capital: Mechelen
- Common languages: Dutch
- Religion: Catholicism
- Government: Feudal Lordship, Principality, Heerlijkheid
- Lord of Mechelen
  - ???: Huis Berthout
- Historical era: Middle Ages, Early Modern Period, French Revolution
  - foundation and First mention of the Berthouts as lords of Mechelen.: 11th century
  - Charles III Simple gives the abbey of Mechelen to the bishop of Liège.: 910
  - Entry for the first time the dominion of Burgundy and The Prince-Bishopric of Liège cedes Malines to the Count of Flanders.: 1333
  - Obtaining county status: 1490
  - The Eighty Years' War: 1568
  - The French Revolutionary Wars and The seigniory is incorporated into the department of Deux-Nèthes.: 1795
Preceded by	Succeeded by
Prince-Bishopric of Liège; Diocese of Liège	Deux-Nèthes; French First Republic
- Today part of: Belgium; Antwerp Province

The Lordship of Mechelen or Malines (Dutch: Heerlijkheid Mechelen, French: Seigneurie de Malines) was a small autonomous Lordship in the Low Countries, consisting of the city of Mechelen and some surrounding villages. It lasted from 910 to 1795.

== History ==
In the early Middle Ages, it was part of the Prince-Bishopric of Liège, which was confirmed in 910. In practice, the area was ruled by the local Berthout family, against the will of the Prince-Bishops of Liège. The Duchy of Brabant tried to annex the Lordship, but as a reaction, Liège gave the area in 1333 to the County of Flanders. The Flemish also didn't gain complete and permanent control.

Mechelen was therefore later considered one of the Seventeen Provinces and then as a province of the Southern Netherlands. The Dukes of Burgundy and later the Habsburg Emperors and Kings were personally Lords of Mechelen and for a while turned the city more or less into the capital of the Netherlands. They established here the highest jurisdictional court of the Seventeen Provinces, called the Great Council of Mechelen. Governess Margaret of Austria also held her Court at Mechelen. Later, the capital moved primarily to Brussels.

In 1795 the Lordship was abolished by the French revolutionaries, and it became part of the French département of the Deux-Nèthes. Today it is part of the Belgian province of Antwerp.

== Areas of the Lordship of Mechelen ==
- the walled city of Mechelen
- the hamlets Nekkerspoel, Nieuwland, Pennepoel, Battel, Geerdegem and others
- the villages of Hever, Muizen, Hombeek, Leest and Heffen
- In a separate enclave, Heist-op-den-Berg and some hamlets like Gestel.
