= Instruction of 12 April 1588 =

Act formally establishing the Dutch Republic

In the history of the Netherlands, the instruction of 12 April 1588 (Dutch: instructie van 12 april 1588) is a decision of the States General of the Netherlands (also known as the "Generality") passed on 12 April 1588 during the Eighty Years' War. It transferred the duties of the executive branch of government from the landvoogd (from which Robert Dudley, 1st Earl of Leicester had recently resigned) to the Council of State. In conjunction with a separate decision taken by the States General to transfer the oaths of allegiance of all officials from Leicester to themselves on the same day, the instruction is widely regarded as the formal establishment of the Dutch Republic.

== Background ==
The States General's instruction was intended for the Council of State, which until then had served as an advisory body to the landvoogd, and previously the governors-general of the Habsburg Netherlands. It largely mirrored the provisions of the Treaty of Nonsuch (1585) concerning the establishment of a central administration in the United Provinces (the regions and cities in the Habsburg Netherlands that were engaged in revolt against the Spanish Empire), in order to provide for some of the shortcomings of the treaty text of the Union of Utrecht. The difference, however, was that there were no longer any references to any sovereignty of Queen Elizabeth I of England, or of Robert Dudley, 1st Earl of Leicester, who had resigned less than two weeks earlier.

The Instruction of 12 April 1588 authorised the Council of State to administer generally the rebellious United Provinces, at that time consisting in whole or in part of Gelre, Holland, Zeeland, Utrecht, Friesland and Overijssel and the Flemish city of Ostend. The same day, the States General took the decision to relieve all officials from their oaths to Leicester and bind them to themselves with a new oath. These two decrees are widely regarded as the establishment of the Dutch Republic (or Republic of the United Netherlands), since the sovereignty of the monarchical hereditary head of state – a position that, since the Act of Abjuration of 1581, had been held first by Francis, Duke of Anjou and last by Robert, Earl of Leicester – were transferred by the States General to the Council of State. Historians note that the passing of these decisions was not otherwise accompanied by much outward show of a solemn proclamation, but was rather the result of a gradual process that no one had foreseen, or had planned in advance.

== Contents ==
With the instruction of 12 April 1588, the States General instructed the Council of State "to conduct and direct the affairs of the Common State, to preserve the defence and the Union of the aforementioned Lands" (Dutch: sullen beleyden ende dirigeren de saicken der Gemeenen Staet, die defensie conserveren ende de Unie vande voorsz. Landen). These were the same duties and competences given to Leicester in 1586. According to Berkhoff, the duties of the Council of State could be summarised as follows

1. 'maintaining treaties concluded with foreign powers and, in general, maintaining good relations with neighbouring countries
2. taking command in military matters
3. managing the general resources (finances) of the Generality
4. exercising the jurisdiction, usually that of the highest court, of the Generality'

However, because the instruction did not precisely delineate duties and competences, the ultimate power of the Council of State would depend on how it would cooperate with the States General. In practice, the States General would prevail and become the highest governing body in the Republic.

== Interpretation ==
The 1588 instruction empowered the Council of State with "the command in war, with the administration of Union funds and with foreign affairs – precisely the three basic tasks of the Generality. Council members were also under oath from the States General and did not have the financial resources to carry out all kinds of tasks without support from the Generality. The States General, originally really only a representative body, had already taken administrative powers to themselves since the Pacification of Ghent of 1576, and convened on its own initiative, which had previously been exclusive privileges of the feudal lord (Philip II of Spain). Eventually the territory of the rebellious Generality coincided with that of the Union of Utrecht; from 1588, they were permanently based at The Hague; from 1593, they met daily (as they were given or took on more and more tasks); and from 1595 (admission of the province of Stad en Lande) the number of provinces represented in the States General was fixed at seven.

Historians have long suspected that a power struggle raged between the Council of State (which had been granted de jure supreme power under the 1588 instruction) and the States General (which acquired de facto supreme power). For instance, Thorbecke, Fruin and Colenbrander believed that 'the States General frequently infringed' on the powers of the Council. But later further historical research revealed that the two colleges worked quite well together. The Council ended up taking over mainly preparatory and executive tasks from the States General to reduce their workload.

== See also ==
- Siege of Medemblik (1588) (27 February – 29 April 1588), which meanwhile took place because Diederik Sonoy and his English soldiers invoked their oath of allegiance to Leicester
- Deduction of Vrancken or Justification or Deduction (1587), by which the States of Holland and Westfriesland and Zealand sought to demonstrate that they held sovereignty in the counties of Holland and Zealand, and not the King of Spain (abjured in 1581), nor Queen Elizabeth I of England, nor the Earl of Leicester
- Proclamation of the abolition of the monarchy, proclamation of the National Convention of France during the French Revolution which announced that it had abolished the French monarchy on 21 September 1792

== Bibliography ==
=== Primary sources ===
- Fontaine, Petrus Franciscus Maria (1954). "Instructie voorden Raed van State vande Vereenichde Nederlanden [12 april 1588]". De Raad van State. Zijn taak, organisatie en werkzaamheden in de jaren 1588–1590. Groningen: Wolters. pp. 298–303. OCLC 781821849.
- Japikse, Nicolas (1922). "De instructie van den Raad van State van 1588" [The instruction of the Council of State of 1588]. BMGN: Low Countries Historical Review. 5 (9): 170–187.
- W, S. (1732). A General Collection of Treatys, Manifestos, Contracts of Marriage, Renunciations, and other Publick Papers, from the Year 1495, to the Year 1712. A General Collection of Treatys. J. J. and P. Knapton.
  - pp. 83—88: Treaty of Nonsuch (10 August 1585).
  - pp. 89–91: Placard States General of the United Provinces, conferring the government of their Countries upon the Earl of Leicester (6 February 1586).
  - pp. 92–97: Placard discharging the Dutch from their Oath to the Earl of Leicester. (States General of the United Provinces, 12 April 1588).

=== Literature ===
- Berkhoff, Marnix (1998). ‘Die saecke der stadt Hasselt’. Een bestuurlijk knelpunt ten tijde van de Republiek der Zeven Verenigde Nederlanden, 1590–1594. Groningen: Rijksuniversiteit Groningen. pp. 11–12. Archived from the original on 13 August 2022.
- Groenveld, Simon (2009). Unie – Bestand – Vrede. Drie fundamentele wetten van de Republiek der Verenigde Nederlanden. Hilversum: Uitgeverij Verloren. p. 200. ISBN 9789087041274. Archived from the original on 28 October 2022. (in cooperation with H.L.Ph. Leeuwenberg and H.B. van der Weel)
- Groenveld, Simon; Leeuwenberg, Huib; Mout, M.; Zappey, W. (2020). De Tachtigjarige Oorlog. Opstand en consolidatie in de Nederlanden (ca. 1560–1650). Derde editie. Zutphen: Walburg Pers. p. 750. ISBN 9789462495661. (e-book; original publication 2008)
- Mulder, Liek; Doedens, Anne; Kortlever, Yolande (2008). Geschiedenis van Nederland, van prehistorie tot heden. Baarn: HBuitgevers. pp. 288. ISBN 9789055746262.
- Thorbecke, Johan Rudolf; Fruin, Robert; Colenbrander, H.T. (1922). "Republiek. 3. Raad van State". Geschiedenis der Staatsinstellingen in Nederland tot de dood van Willem II (in Dutch). dutchrevolt.leiden.edu. Archived from the original on 21 April 2021.
