= Lordship of Frisia =

Feudal dominion in the Netherlands

Lordship of Frisia: Heerlijkheid Friesland (Dutch); Hearlikheid Fryslân (West Frisian)
- 1524–1588
- Coat of arms

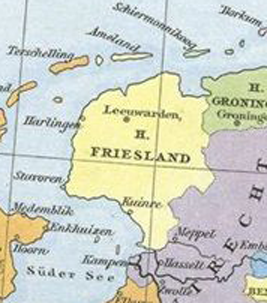
- Lordship of Frisia or Friesland, 1524
- Status: State of the Holy Roman Empire
- Common languages: Old Frisian, West Frisian, Dutch Low Saxon
- Religion: Catholic Church Protestantism
- Government: Feudal lordship
  - 1524–1555: Charles V (first)
  - 1555–1581: Philip II of Spain (last)
- Historical era: Early Modern Period
  - Established: 1524
  - Act of Abjuration: 1581
  - Foundation of Dutch Republic: 1588
| Preceded by | Succeeded by |
| Frisian freedom | Friesland; Dutch Republic |

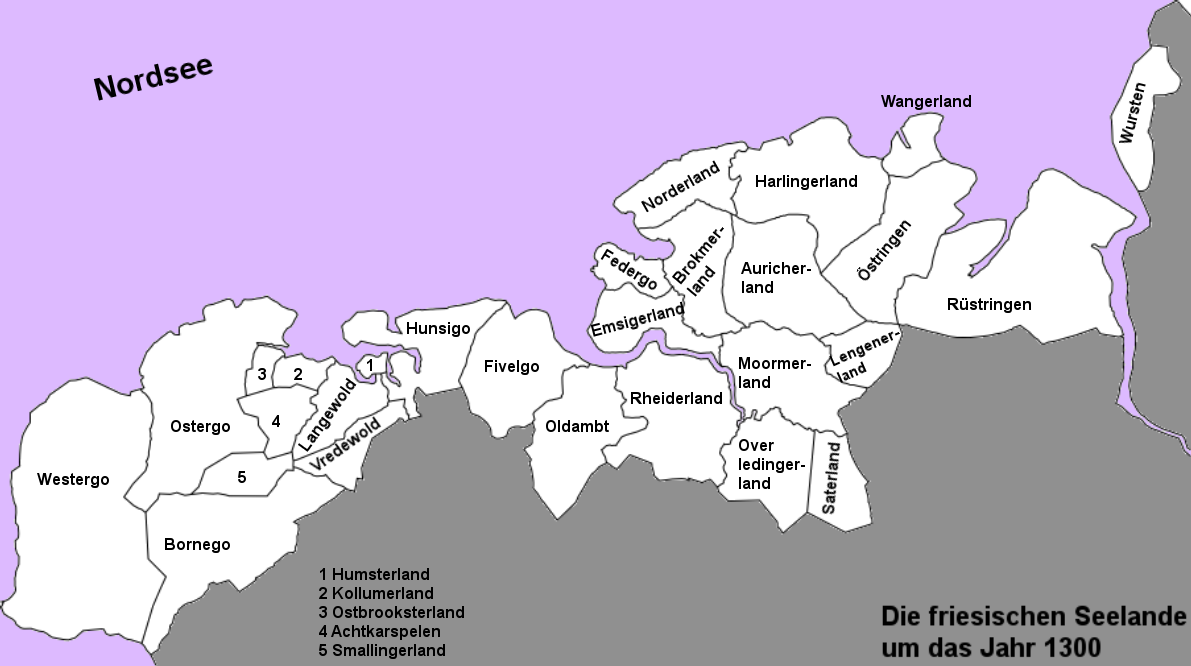
The wider region of Frisia c.1300: the Lordship of Frisia was established in the western part of the region

The Lordship of Frisia (/ˈfriːʒə/) or Friesland (/ˈfriːzlənd/; West Frisian: Hearlikheid Fryslân; Dutch: Heerlijkheid Friesland) was a feudal dominion in the Low Countries established in 1524 by the Habsburg Emperor, Charles V. It lasted until the 1580s when, following the Dutch Revolt against the Habsburgs, it became a province of the newly founded Dutch Republic.

Unlike most of the rest of western Europe during the middle ages, feudalism never developed in Frisia and the region avoided becoming subject to a local overlord. This changed in 1498 when Albert III of Saxony was given the hereditary right by the Emperor Maximilian I to exercise imperial authority in the region. Because of costly wars to assert and maintain their possession of Frisia, Albert's family, after his death, sold their rights to Maximilian's grandson, Charles V who had also inherited the adjacent Burgundian Netherlands. Charles invaded Frisia and in 1524 annexed an area approximately equivalent to the modern Dutch province of Friesland. He then declared this territory to be the Lordship of Frisia or Friesland with himself as lord. This, with his Burgundian inheritance and other subsequent acquisitions, meant that his domains extended over the greater part of the Low Countries.

Charles abdicated in 1555 and his lands in the Netherlands, including Friesland, passed to his son Philip II of Spain. However, resentment against Spanish rule provoked a lengthy revolt against Philip from the late 1560s which ultimately led to the northern part of the Habsburg Netherlands breaking away and, by the 1580s, forming the Dutch Republic. Although Friesland was initially an unenthusiastic participant in the rebellion it ultimately joined the other northern provinces in formally deposing Philip in 1581 and joining the new republic.

== Background ==
=== The Low Countries ===
During the middle ages, the Low Countries were divided between the Kingdom of France and the Holy Roman Empire. Both sides of the boundary between the two realms had developed into a patchwork of counties, duchies and lordships which became, in practice, independent principalities each with its own local ruler. Through marriage, inheritance, conquest and purchase, the Dukes of Burgundy had, during the course of the late 14th and first half of the 15th centuries, gradually accumulated most of these territories under their rule.

Although some central institutions covering the whole of the Burgundian Netherlands were established, the various counties, duchies and lordships remained as separate sovereign entities albeit joined in personal union under the Duke, as a composite monarchy. Not all of the Low Countries had been acquired by the Dukes of Burgundy. In the north, for example, areas such as the Duchy of Guelders and Frisia remained separate despite attempts to annex them, although sometimes the attempts met with short-lived temporary success.

=== Frisia ===
Frisia, a region in the northern Low Countries, formed part of the Holy Roman Empire. During the middle ages, it had developed a unique system of self-rule based on local popular assemblies. Communities were led by judge-administrators who were drawn, by rotation, from among property owners and nobles. Unusually for medieval western Europe, feudalism did not develop and the region had no lord ruling it. This system of self-rule, known as the "Frisian freedom", was acknowledged and formally confirmed by several Holy Roman Emperors.

From the late 13th century the counts of Holland attempted to expand into Frisia and managed to annex West Friesland. The Frisians prevented the loss of any further territory but Floris V of Holland nevertheless added "Lord of Frisia" to his titles. Although his successors continued to claim the title it was without political reality as the greater part of Frisia continued to be independent under the Frisian freedom.

== History ==
=== Creation of the lordship ===
The Frisian freedom came to an end at the end of the 15th century as result of a civil war between two Frisian noble factions: the Vetkopers and Schieringers. The Schieringers requested military support from Albert III, Duke of Saxony and offered, in exchange, for him to become gubernator (Note: That is, governor.) of Frisia. Albert intervened in the conflict but his objective was to acquire the region for himself and develop it into a princely state for his family. Between 1495 and 1497 he allowed his mercenary troops to pillage Frisia in order to de-stabilise it and facilitate his take-over of the region. In 1498, Albert persuaded the Habsburg Holy Roman Emperor, Maximilian I, to appoint him as hereditary gubernator and potestate (Note: The title lord was deliberately not used in order to preserve the pretence that the Frisians continued to hold their lands directly from the Emperor. The title granted to Albert was originally used in a 13th century account of how the Emperor Charlemagne supposedly gave the Frisians their privileges and the Frisian freedom. A central aspect of the story was that only the Emperor could be the Frisians' lord.) of Frisia. Although this did not legally create an Imperial fief, the package of rights granted to him effectively supported the creation of a princely state. By 1500 he had crushed all Frisian opposition.

Albert died in 1500 and his sons, firstly, Henry and, from 1504, George, attempted to build up their nascent state. However, between 1514 and 1515 George was forced to fight a costly war against Charles of Egmond, Duke of Guelders, who was allied to a number of Frisian towns. This induced George to sell his rights in Frisia in 1515 to Maximilian's grandson, the future Holy Roman Emperor Charles V. The Habsburgs, who had inherited the Burgundian Netherlands, wished to expand their territories northward into Frisia and Guelders and, as a result, had already been at war with Charles of Egmond since 1502.

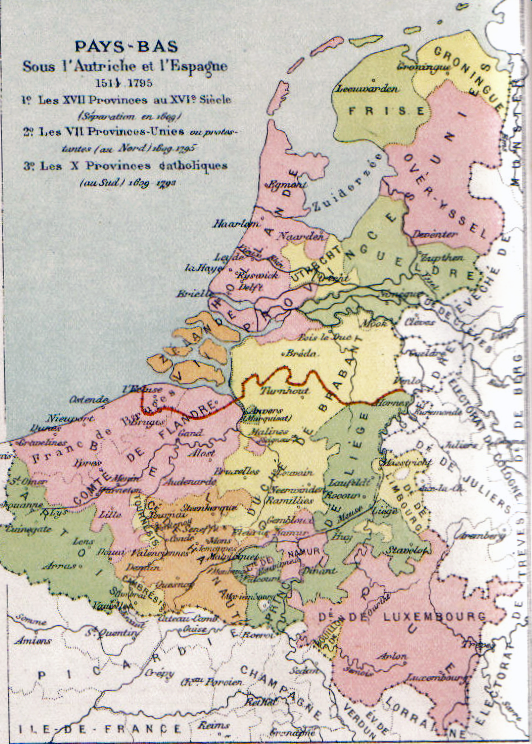
The Seventeen Provinces showing how they were divided (the red line boundary) between the Dutch Republic and the Spanish Netherlands by 1648

Charles, who became emperor in 1519, continued his dynasty's struggle with Charles of Egmond. By 1522, the latter had the upper hand and had taken control of most of Frisia. Over the following two years, however, Charles V reversed the position and conquered an area corresponding approximately to the modern Dutch province of Friesland. In 1524 he erected this territory into the Lordship of Frisia with himself as lord. The new domain, also known as the Lordship of Friesland, thus constituted part of a wider collection of Habsburg territories extending over most of the Low Countries.

=== Development from 1524 to the 1560s ===
With the creation of the lordship, Charles signed an agreement with the Frieslanders under which his right to appoint the most important officials in the territory was accepted. In practice, government remained in the hands of the Frisian nobility and the Habsburg authorities were kept at arm's length.

As in Charles's other territories in the Netherlands, a Stadtholder was appointed to act as Charles's representative in the government of the lordship. The Court of Friesland was established as the lordship's main governmental body with both administrative and judicial functions. Although the States of Friesland existed, it took second place to the Court while Friesland was under Habsburg rule. Importantly, the Court was given a free hand in Friesland with no right of appeal to or supervision by the Great Council of Mechelen, the Habsburg's highest authority in the Netherlands.

In 1549, Charles issued the Pragmatic Sanction which was ratified by the Lordship of Frisia and Charles's other domains in the Netherlands. This aimed to turn the Seventeen Provinces, as they were known, into a single administrative entity albeit that they retained their local rights, privileges and separate identities. Henceforth, they could only be inherited as one unit and would not be divided between different heirs. In 1555, Charles abdicated as ruler of the Netherlands in favour of his son, who would soon also become king of Spain, as Philip II. Despite the Pragmatic Sanction, Philip did not succeed his father as "Lord of the Netherlands" but instead took on the individual titles of each of the separate domains, which remained as distinct counties, duchies and lordships. He thus became, inter alia, Lord of Friesland.

=== The Dutch Revolt and the end of the lordship ===
From the late 1560s, the Dutch Revolt, a rebellion against Philip II and Spanish rule, broke out across the Habsburg Netherlands and lasted until a 12-year truce was signed in 1609. The causes were complex but local particularism and resistance to the repression of Reformed Protestantism, which had grown in popularity, by the Catholic Spanish authorities were central elements. It eventually resulted in the northern Protestant domains breaking away and forming the Dutch Republic, a loose federation of seven of the Seventeen Provinces. After the 12-year truce ended the new republic continued to be at war with Spain until a permanent peace was established in 1648.

Initially, the Frieslanders, who considered themselves both geographically and politically distant from the rest of the Seventeen Provinces, were more interested in local concerns and were unenthusiastic participants in the revolt. In 1576, the States-General, which collectively represented the main provinces of the Habsburg Netherlands, took the leadership of the revolt and established its own army. In Friesland, the States of Friesland asserted its authority and took the lead in the uprising against Philip II, supplanting the Court of Friesland as the province's leading body. In 1578, it had all the members of the Court arrested and replaced. Friesland's Stadtholder, George de Lalaing, Count of Rennenberg, who was also stadtholder of several other neighbouring provinces, took up arms against the Spanish and held his provinces on behalf of the States-General.

Nevertheless, at the time of the creation, in January 1579, of the Union of Utrecht, which would become the founding basis of the Dutch Republic, the majority of the States of Friesland supported a moderate policy of compromise. They accepted Philip II's sovereignty and the position of the Catholic Church but wanted the withdrawal of Spanish troops from the Netherlands and the removal of Catholic bishops who espoused the Counter-Reformation. Although they initially twice voted against joining the Union of Utrecht, by June 1579 Friesland had adhered to it.

The position changed sharply when, in 1580, Rennenberg, who was a Catholic, deserted the States-General's cause, reconciled with Philip II and went over to the side of the Spanish. In response to this "treason", the States of Friesland immediately banned Catholic worship and requested from Holland troops to fight the Spanish forces, which the States committed to pay for. In 1581, Friesland joined the Act of Abjuration by which Philip II was deposed as sovereign of those of his various domains in the Netherlands that were to form the Dutch Republic. He was, therefore, no longer recognised as Lord of Friesland. After a period of attempting, unsuccessfully, to install a foreigner, such as the Duke of Anjou or the Earl of Leicester, to be ruler in place of Philip, the Estates-General finally determined in April 1588 that the territories in revolt would cease to have any lord and, instead, sovereignty would be vested in a republic. Thus, Friesland became a province of that republic.
