= Dutch Republic =

Predecessor state of the Netherlands (1581–1795)

Coordinates: 52°04′47″N 04°18′48″E

Republic of the Seven United Netherlands Republiek der Zeven Verenigde Nederlanden
- 1588–1795
- Flags; Top: Prinsenvlag (1575–1652); Bottom: Statenvlag (1652–1795) Coat of arms
- Motto: Eendracht maakt macht Concordia res parvæ crescunt "Unity makes strength" "Small things flourish by concord"
- Republic of the Seven United Netherlands in 1789
- Capital: None (de jure); The Hague (de facto)
- Common languages: Dutch, Dutch Low Saxon, West Frisian
- Religion: Dutch Reformed (state religion), Catholicism, Judaism, Lutheranism
- Demonym: Dutch
- Government: Confederal parliamentary republic
- Stadtholder
  - 1584–1625: Maurice
  - 1625–1647: Frederick
  - 1647–1650: William II
  - 1672–1702: William III
  - 1747–1751: William IV
  - 1751–1795: William V
- Grand pensionary
  - 1586–1619 (first): Johan van Oldenbarnevelt
  - 1787–1795 (last): Laurens Pieter van de Spiegel
- Legislature: States General
  - State Council: Council of State
- Historical era: Early modern period
  - Act of Abjuration: 26 July 1581
  - Instruction of 12 April 1588: 12 April 1588
  - Peace of Münster: 30 January 1648
  - Rampjaar: 1672
  - Peace of Utrecht: 11 April 1713
  - Batavian Revolution: 19 January 1795

Population
  - 1795: 1,880,500
- Currency: Guilder, rijksdaalder
Preceded by
Duchy of Brabant
Duchy of Guelders
County of Flanders
County of Holland
County of Zeeland
Lordship of Frisia
Lordship of Mechelen
Lordship of Utrecht
Succeeded by
Batavian Republic
Kingdom of Prussia
Electorate of Cologne
First French Republic
- Today part of: Netherlands; Belgium; Germany; France

History of the Low Countries (schematic)
Frisii		Germanic tribes		Belgae & Celts			
Frisii	Cana– nefates (Note: Roman foederati)	Chamavi, Tubantes (Note: The Chamavi merged into the confederation of the Franks; the Tubantes merged into the confederation of the Saxons.)		Gallia Belgica (55 BC–c. 5th century AD); Germania Inferior (83–c. 5th century)			
Frisii	Cana– nefates	Salian Franks		Batavi			
unpopulated (4th –c. 5th centuries)		Saxons	Salian Franks (4th–c. 5th centuries)				
Frisian Kingdom (c. 6th century – 734)		Saxons	Frankish Kingdom (481–843)—Carolingian Empire (800–843)				
Frisian Kingdom (c. 6th century – 734)		Austrasia (511–687)					
Middle Francia (843–855)				West; Francia (from 843)	Middle Francia (843–855)		
Kingdom of Lotharingia (Note: Part of East Francia after 939, divided in Upper Lorraine (as part of West Francia) and Lower Lorraine (as part of East Francia) in 959.) (855–959); Duchy of Lower Lorraine (Note: Lower Lorraine—also referred to as Lothier—disintegrated into several smaller independent territories and only the title of a "Duke of Lothier" remained, held by Brabant.) (from 959)			Kingdom of Lotharingia (855–959); Duchy of Lower Lorraine (from 959)	West; Francia (from 843)	Kingdom of Lotharingia (855–959); Duchy of Lower Lorraine (from 959)		
Frisia			Kingdom of Lotharingia (855–959); Duchy of Lower Lorraine (from 959)	County of Flanders (Note: Including County of Artois (part of Flanders until 1237) and Tournaisis.) (862–1384)	Kingdom of Lotharingia (855–959); Duchy of Lower Lorraine (from 959)		
Frisian; Freedom (Note: Lordship of Frisia and Lordship of Groningen (including the Ommelanden) after 1524 and 1536 respectively.) (11th–16th centuries)	County of Holland (Note: Including County of Zeeland, that was ruled by neighboring County of Holland and County of Flanders (until 1432).) (880–1432)	Bishopric of Utrecht (Note: Utrecht included Lordship of Overijssel (until 1528), County of Drenthe (until 1528) and County of Zutphen (until 1182).) (695–1456)	Duchy of Brabant (Note: Duchy of Brabant included since 1288 also the Duchy of Limburg (now part of Belgium's Liège Province) and the "Overmaas" lands Dalhem, Valkenburg and Herzogenrath (now part of the Dutch Province of Limburg).) (1183–1430) Duchy of Guelders (Note: The county, later duchy, of Guelders consisted of four quarters, as they were separated by rivers: situated upstream Upper Quarter (the present day northern half of the Dutch province of Limburg), spatially separated from the three downstream Lower Quarters: County of Zutphen (after 1182), Veluwe Quarter and Nijmegen Quarter. The three lower quarters emerged from the historic gau Hamaland (named after the Chamavi tribe), and formed the present day province of Gelderland. Guelders did not include the Cleves enclave Huissen and the independent counties of Buren and Culemborg, that were much later seceded to the province of Gelderland.) (1046–1543)	County of Flanders (862–1384)	County of Hainaut (1071–1432) County of Namur (981–1421)	Prince- Bishopric of Liège (Note: Throughout the Middle Ages, the bishopric was further expanded with the Duchy of Bouillon in 1096 (ceded to France in 1678), the acquisition of the county of Loon in 1366 and the county of Horne in 1568. The Lordship of Mechelen was also part of the Prince-Bishopric of Liège.)(980–1791)	Duchy of Luxembourg (1059–1443)
Frisian; Freedom (11th–16th centuries)	Burgundian Netherlands (1384–1482)					Prince- Bishopric of Liège (980–1791)	Burgundian Netherlands (1384–1482)
Habsburg Netherlands (1482–1795) (Seventeen Provinces after 1543) (Note: The name Seventeen Provinces came in use after the Habsburg emperor Charles V had re-acquired the Duchy of Guelders, and an continuous territory arose.)						Prince- Bishopric of Liège (980–1791)	Habsburg Netherlands (1482–1795) (Seventeen Provinces after 1543)
Dutch Republic (1581–1795)				Spanish Netherlands (1556–1714)		Prince- Bishopric of Liège (980–1791)	Spanish Netherlands (1556–1714)
Dutch Republic (1581–1795)				Austrian Netherlands (1714–1795)		Prince- Bishopric of Liège (980–1791)	Austrian Netherlands (1714–1795)
Dutch Republic (1581–1795)				United States of Belgium (1790)		Republic of Liège (1789–'91)	United States of Belgium (1790)
Dutch Republic (1581–1795)				Austrian Netherlands (1795–1797)		P.-Bish. of Liège (1791–1794)	Austrian Netherlands (1795–1797)
Batavian Republic (1795–1806); Kingdom of Holland (1806–1810)			associated with French First Republic (1795–1804) part of First French Empire (1804–1815)				
part of First French Empire (1810–1813)			associated with French First Republic (1795–1804) part of First French Empire (1804–1815)				
Sovereign Principality of the Netherlands (1813–1815)			associated with French First Republic (1795–1804) part of First French Empire (1804–1815)				
United Kingdom of the Netherlands (1815–1830)							Grand Duchy of Luxembourg (from 1815)
Kingdom of the Netherlands (from 1839)				Kingdom of Belgium (from 1830)			Grand Duchy of Luxembourg (from 1815)
Kingdom of the Netherlands (from 1839)				Kingdom of Belgium (from 1830)			Grand Duchy of Luxembourg (from 1890)

The Republic of the Seven United Netherlands, (Note: Dutch: Republiek der Zeven Verenigde Nederlanden) also known as the United Provinces, and referred to in historiography as the Dutch Republic, was a confederation and great power that existed from 1588 until the Batavian Revolution in 1795. It was a predecessor state of the present-day Netherlands and the first independent Dutch nation state. The republic was established after seven Dutch provinces in the Spanish Netherlands revolted against Spanish rule, forming a mutual alliance against Spain in 1579 (the Union of Utrecht) and declaring their independence in 1581 (the Act of Abjuration), after which they confederated in 1588 (the Instruction of 12 April 1588) after the States General could not agree on a new monarch. The seven provinces it comprised were Groningen (present-day Groningen), Frisia (present-day Friesland), Overijssel (present-day Overijssel), Guelders (present-day Gelderland), Utrecht (present-day Utrecht), Holland (present-day North Holland and South Holland), and Zeeland (present-day Zeeland).

Although the state was small and had only around 1.5 million inhabitants, it controlled a worldwide network of seafaring trade routes. Through its trading companies, the Dutch East India Company (VOC) and the Dutch West India Company (GWC), it established a Dutch colonial empire. The income from this trade allowed the Dutch Republic to compete militarily against much larger countries. Major conflicts were fought in the Eighty Years' War against Spain (from the foundation of the Dutch Republic until 1648), the Dutch–Portuguese War (1598–1663), four Anglo-Dutch Wars (1652–1654, 1665–1667, 1672–1674, and 1780–1784), the Franco-Dutch War (1672–1678), War of the Grand Alliance (1688–1697), the War of the Spanish Succession (1702–1713), the War of Austrian Succession (1744–1748), and the War of the First Coalition (1792–1797) against the Kingdom of France.

The republic was more tolerant of different religions and ideas than contemporary states, allowing freedom of thought to its residents. Artists flourished under this regime, including painters such as Rembrandt, Johannes Vermeer, and many others. So did scientists, such as Hugo Grotius, Christiaan Huygens, and Antonie van Leeuwenhoek. Dutch trade, science, armed forces, and art were among the most acclaimed in the world during much of the 17th century, a period which became known as the Dutch Golden Age.

The republic was a confederation of provinces, each with a high degree of independence from the federal assembly: the States General. In the Peace of Westphalia (1648), the republic gained approximately 20% more territory, located outside the member provinces, which was ruled directly by the States General as Generality Lands. Each province was led by a stadtholder (Dutch for 'steward'); this office was nominally open to anyone, but most provinces appointed a member of the House of Orange. The position gradually became hereditary, with the Prince of Orange simultaneously holding most or all of the stadtholderships, making him effectively the head of state. This created tension between political factions: the Orangists favoured a powerful stadtholder, while the Republicans favoured a strong States General. The Republicans forced two Stadtholderless Periods, 1650–1672 and 1702–1747, with the latter causing national instability and the end of great power status.

Economic decline led to the 1780–1787 Patriottentijd, a period of political instability. This unrest was temporarily suppressed by a Prussian invasion in support of the stadtholder. The French Revolution and subsequent War of the First Coalition reignited these tensions. Following military defeat by France, the stadtholder was expelled in the Batavian Revolution of 1795, ending the Dutch Republic, which was succeeded by the Batavian Republic.

== History ==
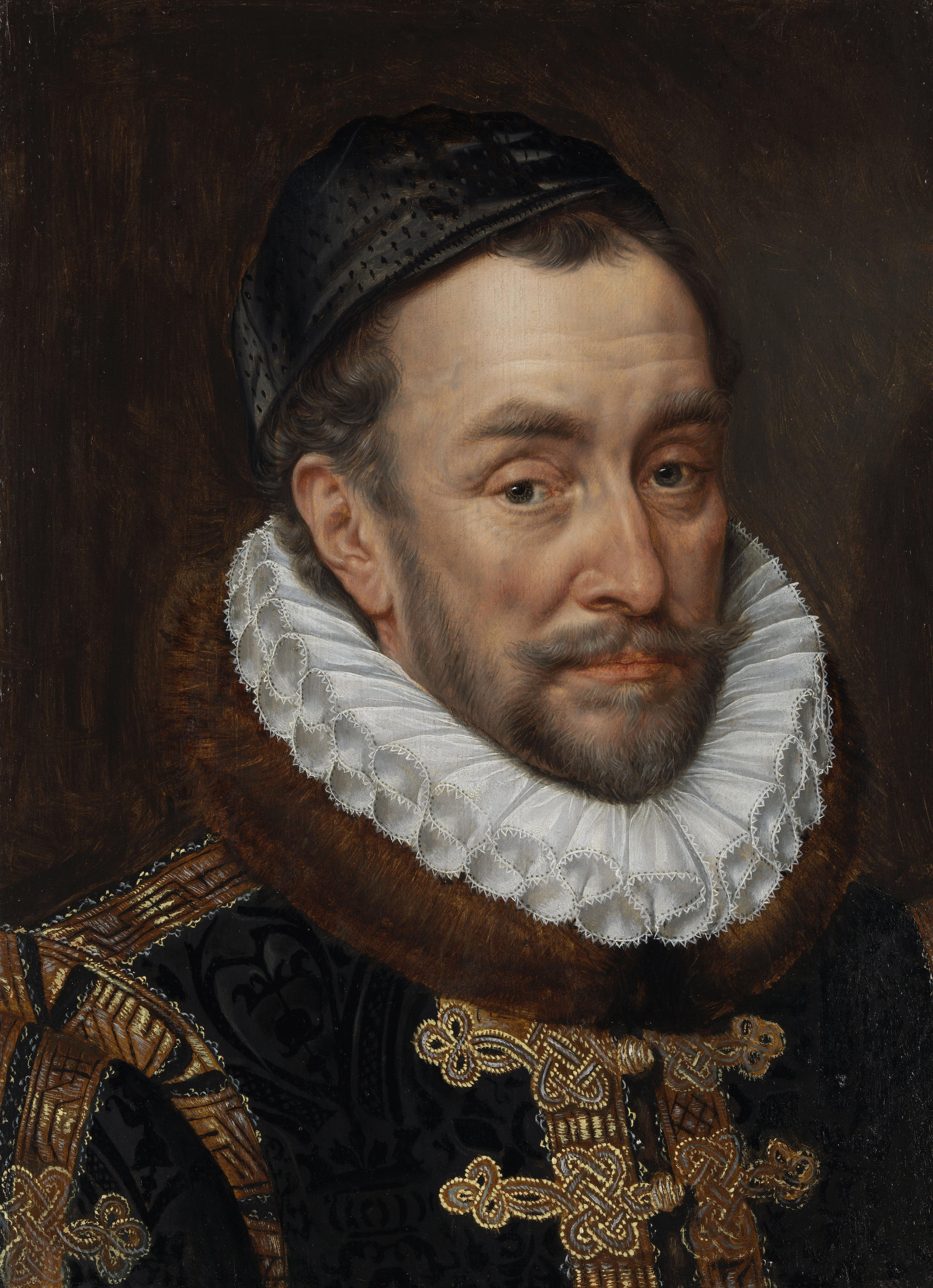
William of Orange, by Adriaen Thomasz Key.

Until the 16th century, the Low Countries—corresponding roughly to the present-day Netherlands, Belgium, and Luxembourg—consisted of a number of duchies, counties, and prince-bishoprics, almost all of which were under the supremacy of the Holy Roman Empire, with the exception of the County of Flanders, most of which was under the Kingdom of France.

Most of the Low Countries had come under the rule of the House of Burgundy and subsequently the House of Habsburg. In 1549, Holy Roman Emperor Charles V issued the Pragmatic Sanction, which further unified the Seventeen Provinces under his rule. In 1568, the Netherlands, led by William I of Orange, together with Philip de Montmorency, Count of Hoorn, and Lamoral, Count of Egmont revolted against Charles's successor, Philip II of Spain, because of high taxes, persecution of Protestants by the government, and Philip's efforts to modernize and centralize the devolved-medieval government structures of the provinces. This was the start of the Eighty Years' War. During the initial phase of the war, the revolt was largely unsuccessful. Spain regained control over most of the rebelling provinces. This period is known as the "Spanish Fury" due to the high number of massacres, instances of mass looting, and total destruction of multiple cities, in particular Antwerp between 1572 and 1579.

In 1579, a number of the northern provinces of the Low Countries signed the Union of Utrecht, in which they promised to support each other in their defence against the Army of Flanders. This was followed in 1581 by the Act of Abjuration, the declaration of independence of the provinces from Philip II. Dutch colonialism began at this point, as the Netherlands was able to capture a number of Portuguese and Spanish colonies, particularly in the Asia-Pacific region. After the assassination of William of Orange on 10 July 1584, both Henry III of France and Elizabeth I of England declined offers of sovereignty. However, the latter agreed to turn the United Provinces into a protectorate of England (Treaty of Nonsuch, 1585), and sent the Earl of Leicester as governor-general. This was unsuccessful, and with the instruction of 12 April 1588, the United Provinces became a republic. The Union of Utrecht is regarded as the foundation of the Republic of the Seven United Provinces, which was not recognized by Spain until the Peace of Westphalia in 1648.

=== Religious tolerance and refugees ===
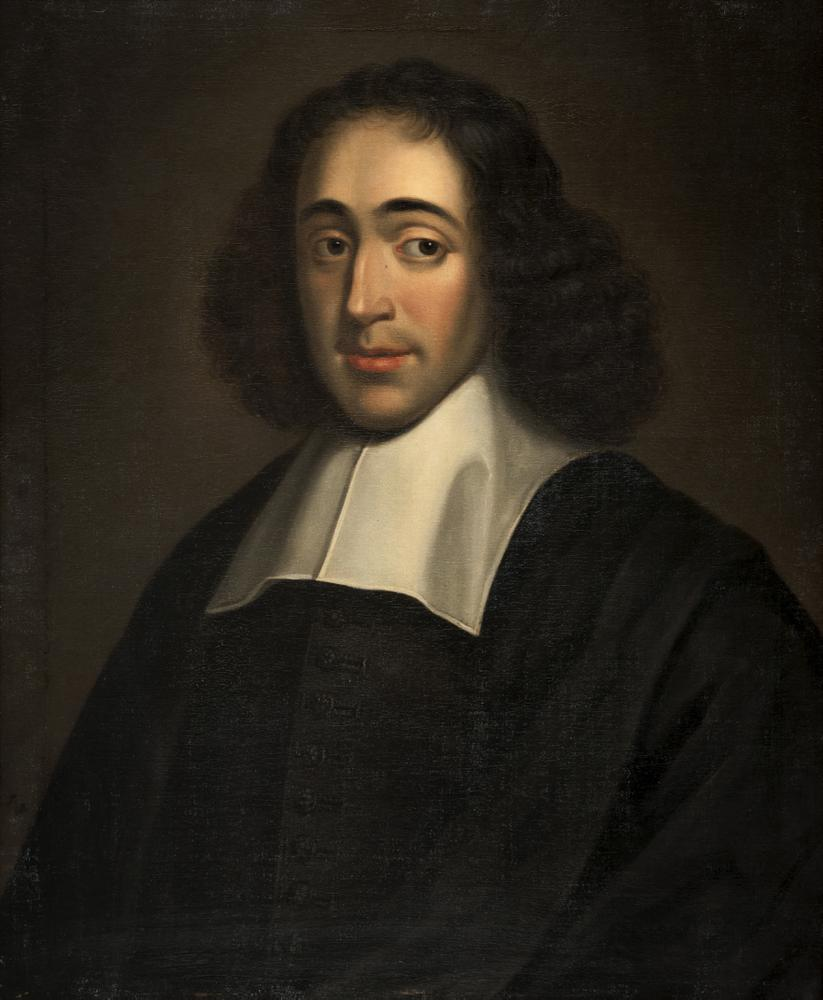
Anonymous portrait of the Dutch philosopher Baruch Spinoza. He was of Portuguese-Jewish origin.

An important factor in the growth of the Netherlands as an economic power was the influx of groups seeking religious toleration of the Dutch Republic. In particular, it became the destination of Portuguese and Spanish Jews fleeing the Inquisitions in Iberia in the sixteenth and seventeenth centuries. and later, poorer German Jews. The Portuguese Jewish community had many wealthy merchants who, both lived openly as Jews and participated in the thriving economy on a par with wealthy Dutch merchants. The Netherlands became home to many other notable refugees, including Protestants from Antwerp and Flanders, which remained under Spanish Catholic rule; French Huguenots; and English Dissenters, including the Pilgrim Fathers. Many immigrants came to the cities of Holland in the 17th and 18th century from the Protestant parts of Germany and elsewhere. The number of first-generation immigrants from outside the Netherlands in Amsterdam was nearly 50% in the 17th and 18th centuries. Amsterdam, which was a hub of the Atlantic world, had a population primarily of immigrants and others not considered Dutch, if one includes second and third generation immigrants. There were also migrants from the Dutch countryside. People in most parts of Europe were poor and many were unemployed. But in Amsterdam there was always work. Religious toleration was important, because a continuous influx of immigrants was necessary for the economy. Travellers visiting Amsterdam reported their surprise at the lack of control over the influx.

=== Economic growth ===
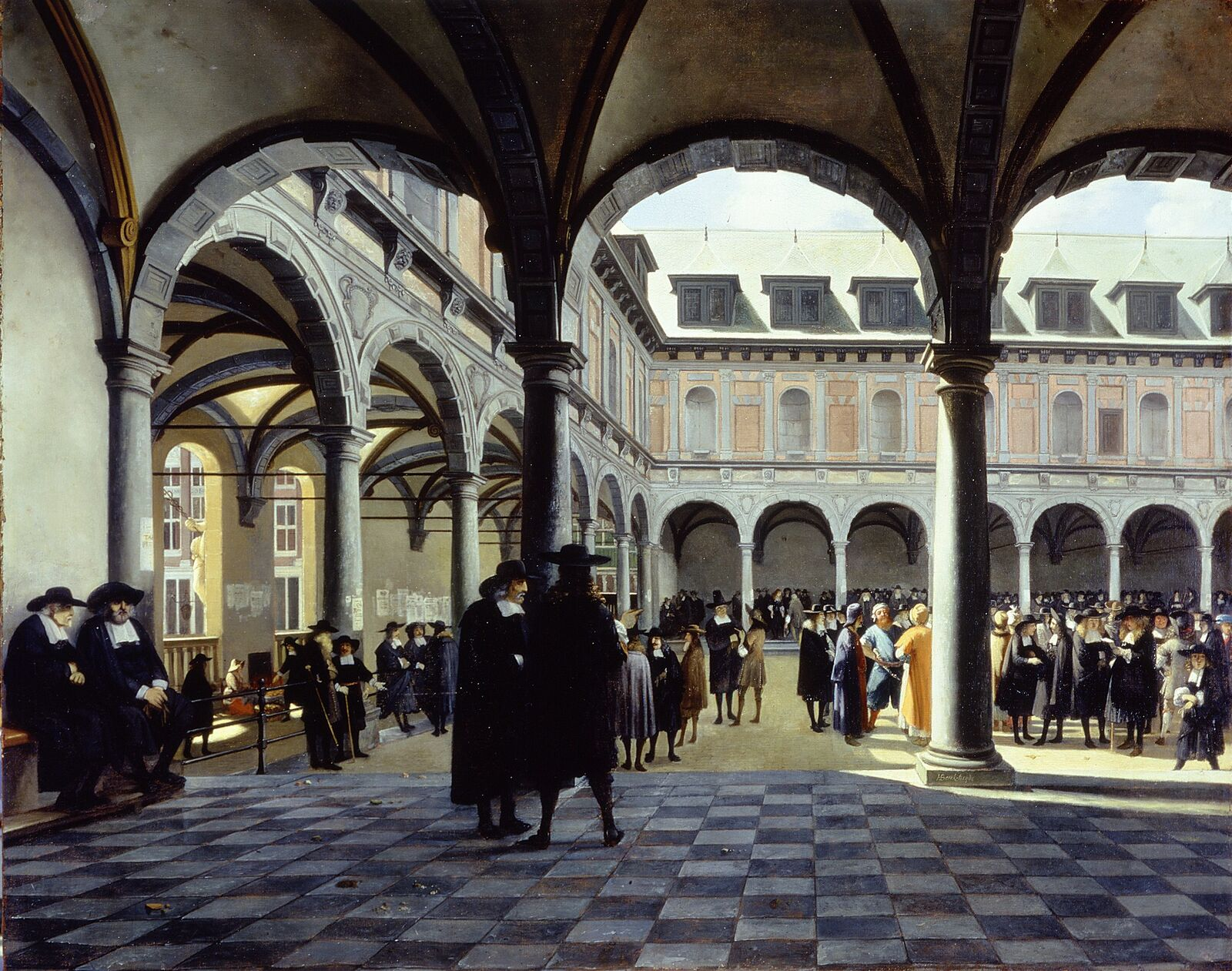
The Amsterdam Stock Exchange, by Job Adriaenszoon Berckheyde

The era of explosive economic growth is roughly coterminous with the period of social and cultural bloom that has been called the Dutch Golden Age, and that actually formed the material basis for that cultural era. Amsterdam became the hub of world trade, the center into which staples and luxuries flowed for sorting, processing, and distribution, and then reexported around Europe and the world.

During 1585 through 1622 there was the rapid accumulation of trade capital, often brought in by refugee merchants from Antwerp and other ports. The money was typically invested in high-risk ventures like pioneering expeditions to the East Indies to engage in the spice trade. These ventures were soon consolidated in the Dutch East India Company (VOC). There were similar ventures in different fields however, like the trade on Russia and the Levant. The profits of these ventures were ploughed back in the financing of new trade, which led to its exponential growth.

Rapid industrialization led to the rapid growth of the nonagricultural labor force and the increase in real wages during the same time. In the half-century between 1570 and 1620 this labor supply increased 3 percent per annum, a truly phenomenal growth. Despite this, nominal wages were repeatedly increased, outstripping price increases. In consequence, real wages for unskilled laborers were 62 percent higher in 1615–1619 than in 1575–1579.

=== Amsterdam ===
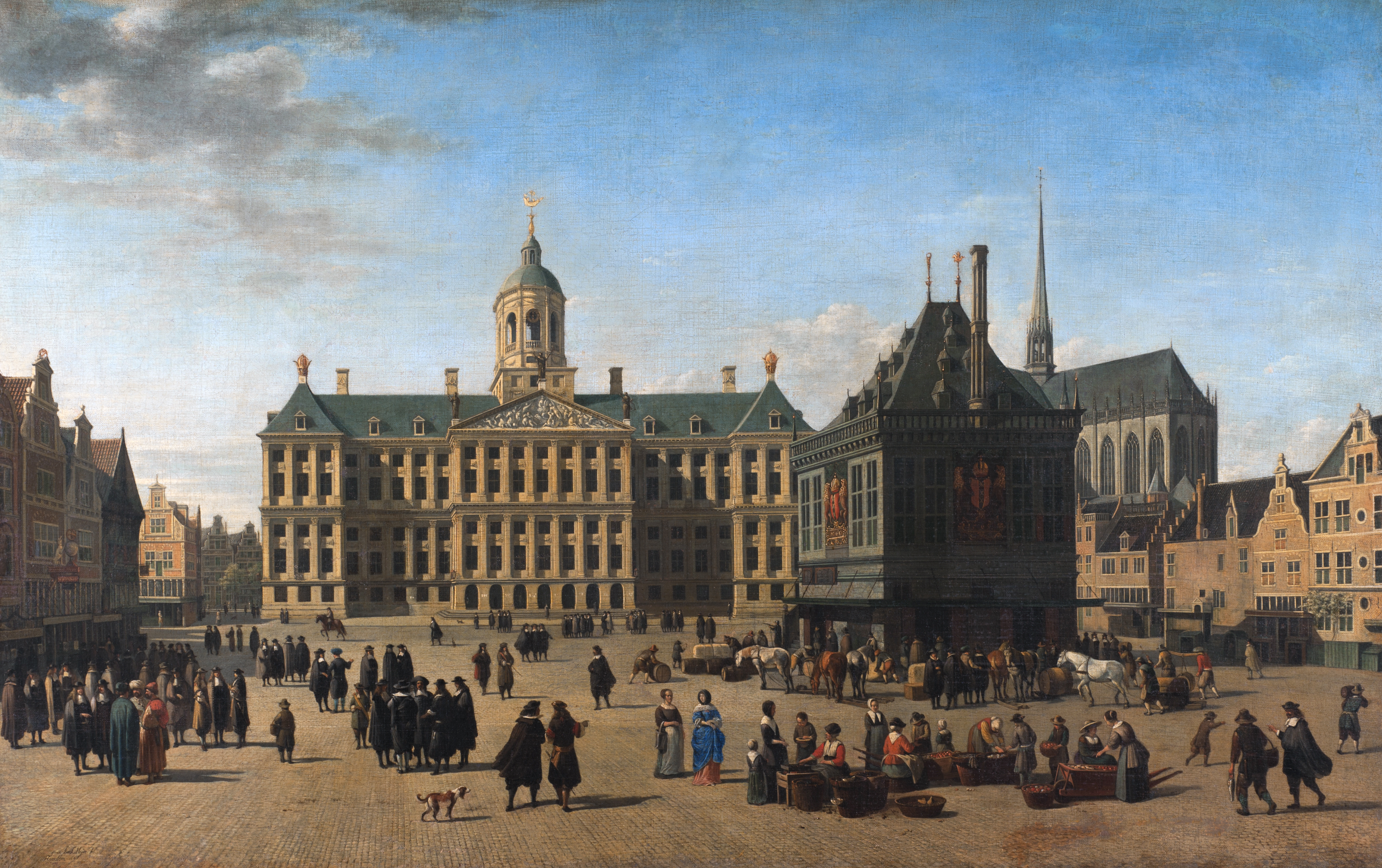
Dam Square in the late 17th century: painting by Gerrit Adriaenszoon Berckheyde

By the mid-1660s Amsterdam had reached the optimum population (about 200,000) for the level of trade, commerce and agriculture then available to support it. The city contributed the largest quota in taxes to the States of Holland which in turn contributed over half the quota to the States General. Amsterdam was also one of the most reliable in settling tax demands and therefore was able to use the threat to withhold such payments to good effect.

Amsterdam was governed by a body of regents, a large, but closed, oligarchy with control over all aspects of the city's life, and a dominant voice in the foreign affairs of Holland. Only men with sufficient wealth and a long enough residence within the city could join the ruling class. The first step for an ambitious and wealthy merchant family was to arrange a marriage with a long-established regent family. In the 1670s one such union, that of the Trip family (the Amsterdam branch of the Swedish arms makers) with the son of Burgomaster Valckenier, extended the influence and patronage available to the latter and strengthened his dominance of the council. The oligarchy in Amsterdam thus gained strength from its breadth and openness. In the smaller towns family interest could unite members on policy decisions but contraction through intermarriage could lead to the degeneration of the quality of the members.

In Amsterdam the network was so large that members of the same family could be related to opposing factions and pursue widely separated interests. The young men who had risen to positions of authority in the 1670s and 1680s consolidated their hold on office well into the 1690s and even the new century.

Amsterdam's regents provided good services to residents. They spent heavily on the water-ways and other essential infrastructure, as well as municipal almshouses for the elderly, hospitals and churches.

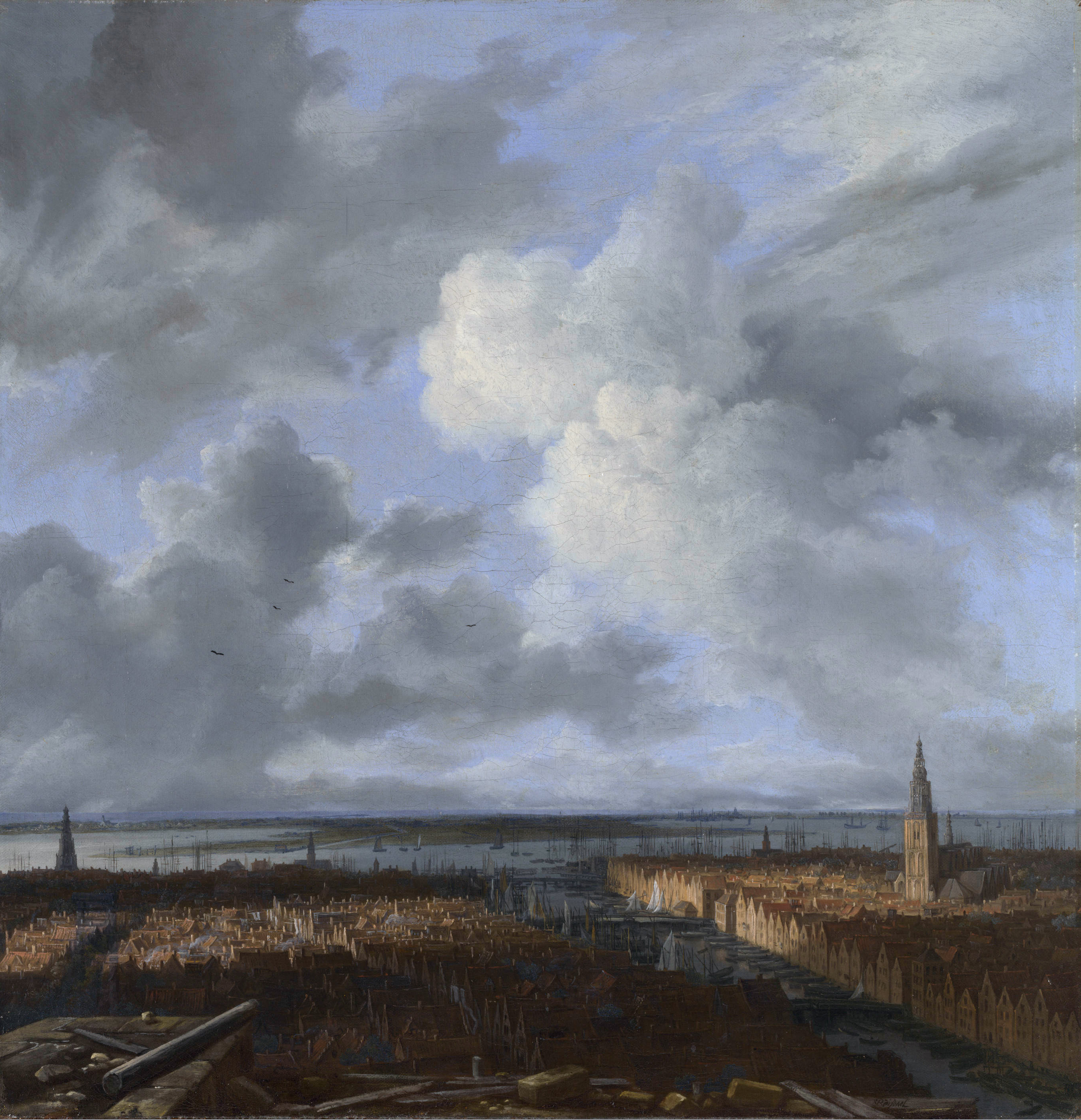
A view of Amsterdam, by Jacob van Ruisdael

Amsterdam's wealth was generated by its commerce, which was in turn sustained by the judicious encouragement of entrepreneurs whatever their origin. This open door policy has been interpreted as proof of a tolerant ruling class. But tolerance was practiced for the convenience of the city. Therefore, the wealthy Sephardic Jews from Portugal were welcomed and accorded all privileges except those of citizenship, but the poor Ashkenazi Jews from Eastern Europe were far more carefully vetted and those who became dependent on the city were encouraged to move on. Similarly, provision for the housing of Huguenot immigrants was made in 1681 when Louis XIV's religious policy was beginning to drive these Protestants out of France; no encouragement was given to the dispossessed Dutch from the countryside or other towns of Holland. The regents encouraged immigrants to build churches and provided sites or buildings for churches and temples for all except the most radical sects and the Catholics by the 1670s (although even the Catholics could practice quietly in a chapel within the Beguinhof).

=== First Stadtholderless Period (1650–1675) ===
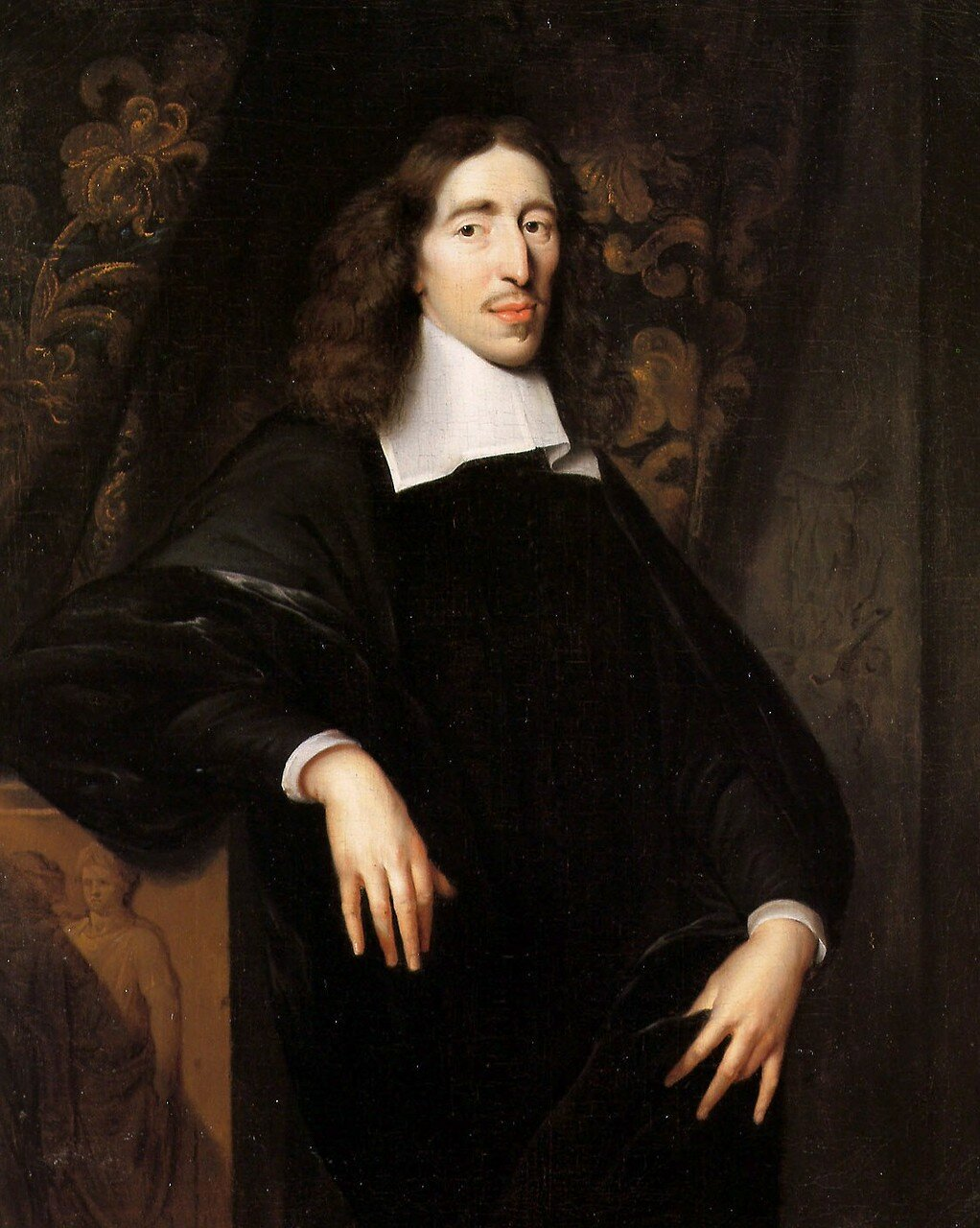
Johan de Witt, Grand Pensionary of Holland, by Caspar Netscher

During the wars a tension had arisen between the Orange-Nassau leaders and the patrician merchants. The former—the Orangists—were soldiers and centralizers who seldom spoke of compromise with the enemy and looked for military solutions. They included many rural gentry as well as ordinary folk attached to the banner of the House of Orange. The latter group were the Republicans, led by the Grand Pensionary (a sort of prime minister) and the regents stood for localism, municipal rights, commerce, and peace. In 1650, the stadtholder William II, Prince of Orange suddenly died; his son was a baby and the Orangists were leaderless. The regents seized the opportunity: there would be no new stadtholder in Holland for 22 years. Johan de Witt, a brilliant politician and diplomat, emerged as the dominant figure. Princes of Orange became the stadtholder and an almost hereditary ruler in 1672 and 1748. The Dutch Republic of the United Provinces was a true republic from 1650 to 1672 and 1702–1748. These periods are called the First Stadtholderless Period and Second Stadtholderless Period.

=== First and Second Anglo-Dutch wars ===
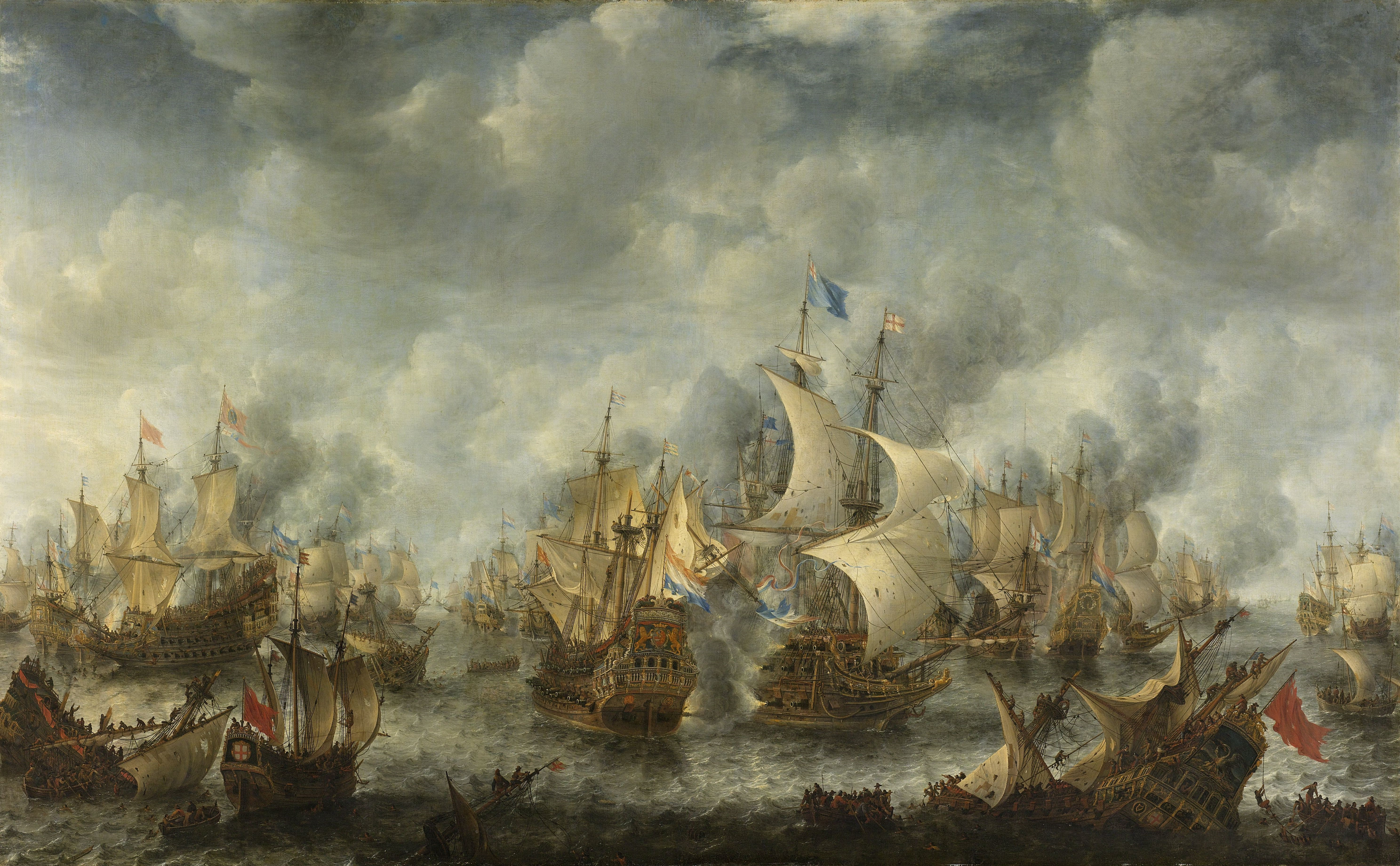
The Battle of Scheveningen, 10 August 1653

The Dutch and English were major rivals in world trade and naval power. Halfway through the 17th century the Dutch States Navy was the rival of the English Royal Navy as the most powerful navy in the world. The Republic fought a series of three naval wars against England from 1652 to 1674.

In 1651, the Parliament of England introduced the Navigation Act, which restricted Dutch trade with English colonies. An incident at sea concerning the Act resulted in the First Anglo-Dutch War, which lasted from 1652 to 1654, ending in the Treaty of Westminster (1654), which left the Navigation Act in effect.

After the Stuart Restoration in 1660, Charles II tried to serve his dynastic interests by attempting to make Prince William III of Orange, his nephew, stadtholder of the Republic, using some military pressure. King Charles thought a naval war would weaken the Dutch traders and strengthen the English economy and empire, so the Second Anglo-Dutch War was launched in 1665. At first many Dutch ships were captured and the English scored great victories. England had the naval advantage with larger numbers of more powerful "ships of the line" which were well suited to the naval tactics of the era. Holmes's Bonfire was a raid on the Vlie estuary in the Netherlands, executed by the English Fleet during the Second Anglo-Dutch War on 19 and 20 August 1666. The attack, named after the commander of the landing force, Rear-Admiral Robert Holmes, was successful in destroying by fire a large Dutch merchant fleet of 140 ships. During the same action, the town of West-Terschelling was burnt down, which caused outrage in the Dutch Republic.

However, the Raid on the Medway, in June 1667, ended the war with a Dutch victory. The Dutch recovered their trade, while the English economy was seriously hurt and its treasury nearly bankrupt. The English would also soon recover.

=== Franco-Dutch War and Third Anglo-Dutch War (1672–1702) ===
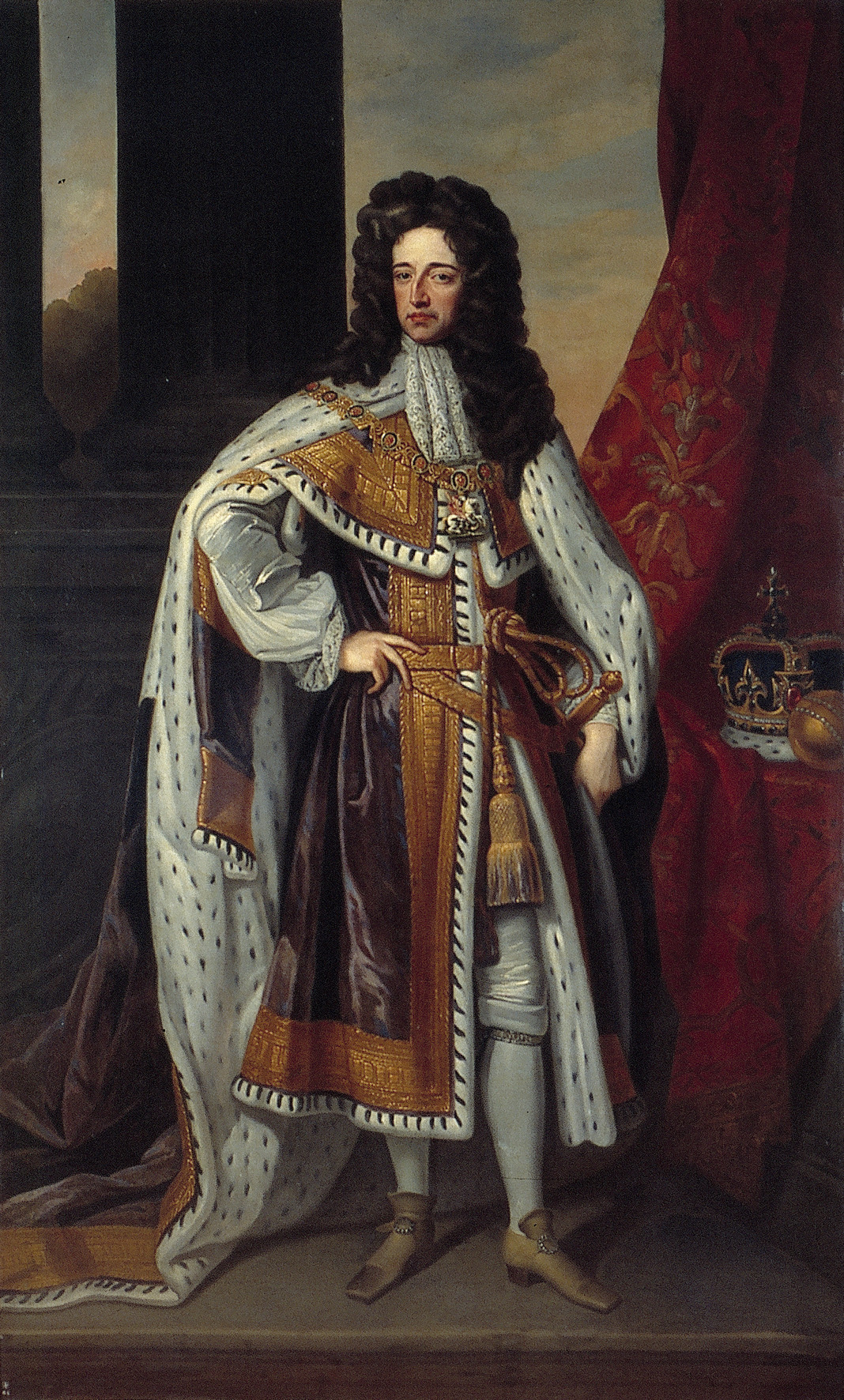
Stadtholder William III, Prince of Orange, also reigned as William III of England from 1689 to 1702 after the Glorious Revolution, with his wife Mary II.

The year 1672 is known in the Netherlands as the "Disaster Year" (Rampjaar). England declared war on the Republic, (the Third Anglo-Dutch War), followed by France, Münster and Cologne, which had all signed alliances against the Republic. France, Cologne and Münster invaded the Republic. Johan de Witt and his brother Cornelis, who had accomplished a diplomatic balancing act for a long time, were now the obvious scapegoats. They were lynched, and a new stadtholder, William III, was appointed.

An Anglo-French attempt to land on the Dutch shore was barely repelled in three desperate naval battles under command of Admiral Michiel de Ruyter. The advance of French troops from the south was halted by a costly inundation of its own heartland, by breaching river dikes. With the aid of friendly German princes, the Dutch succeeded in fighting back Cologne and Münster, after which the peace was signed with both of them, although some territory in the east was lost forever. Peace was signed with England as well, in 1674 (Second Treaty of Westminster). In 1678, peace was made with France at the Treaty of Nijmegen, although the Spanish and German allies of the Dutch Republic felt betrayed by this.

In 1688, at the start of the Nine Years' War with France, the relations with England reached crisis level once again. Convinced that he needed English support against France and that he had to prevent a second Anglo-French alliance, Stadtholder William III decided he had to take a huge gamble and invade England. To this end he secured the support from the Dutch States-General and from Protestant English nobles opposed to William's Catholic father-in-law James II of England. This led to the Glorious Revolution and cemented the principle of parliamentary rule and Protestant ascendency in England. James fled to France, and William ascended to the English throne as co-monarch with his wife Mary II, James' eldest daughter. This manoeuvre secured England as a critical ally of the United Provinces in its ongoing war with Louis XIV of France. William was the commander of the Dutch and English armies and fleets until his death in 1702. During William's reign as King of England, his primary focus was leveraging English manpower and finances to aid the Dutch against the French. The combination continued during the War of the Spanish Succession after his death as the combined Dutch, English, and Imperial armies conquered Flanders and Brabant, and invaded French territory before the alliance collapsed in 1713 due to British political infighting.

=== Second Stadtholderless Period (1702–1747) ===
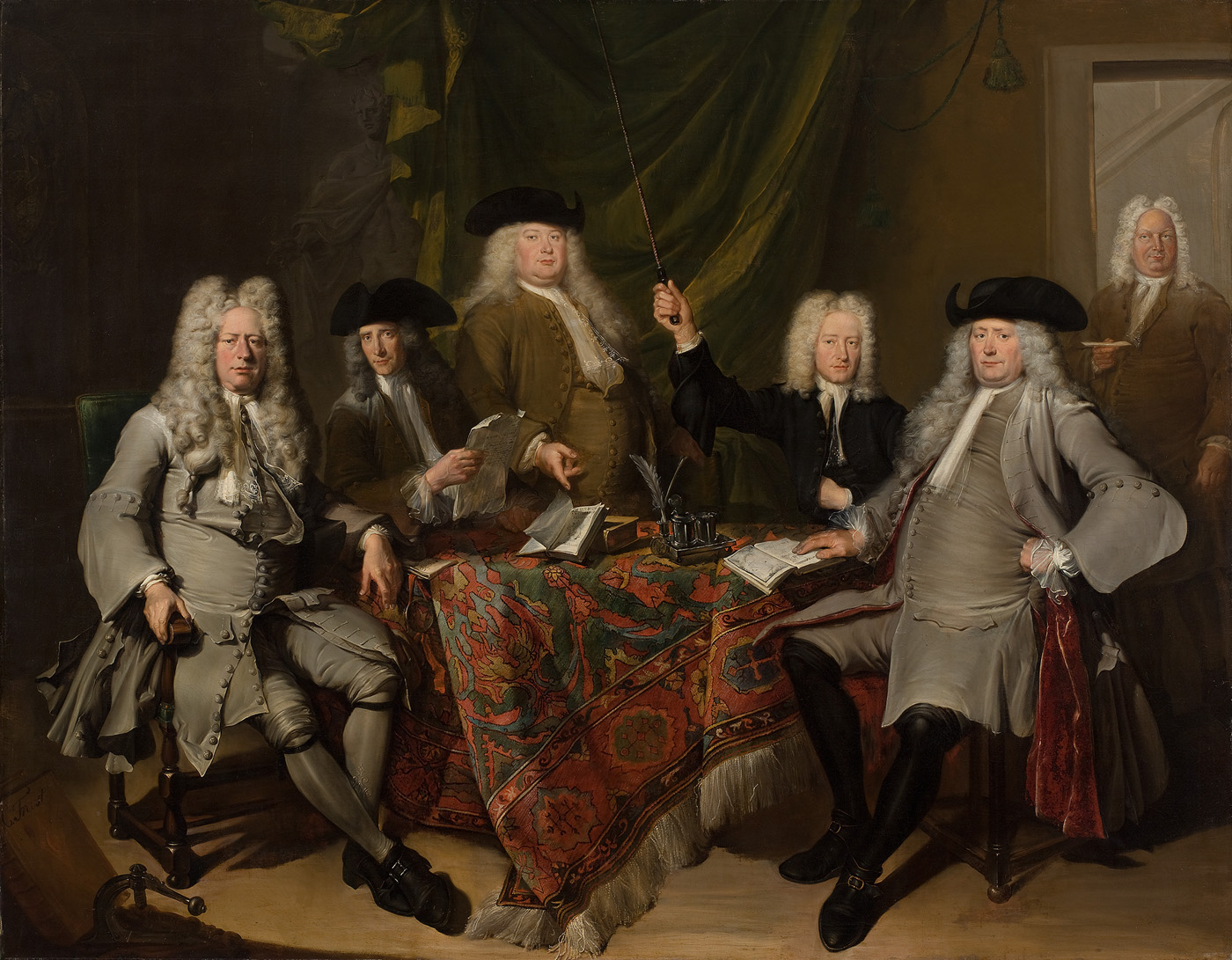
The Inspectors of the Collegium Medicum in Amsterdam, by Cornelis Troost, 1724. This period is known as the "Periwig Era".

The Second Stadtholderless Period (Dutch: Tweede Stadhouderloze Tijdperk) is the designation in Dutch historiography of the period between the death of stadtholder William III on 19 March 1702 and the appointment of William IV, Prince of Orange as stadtholder and captain general in all provinces of the Dutch Republic on 2 May 1747. During this period the office of stadtholder was left vacant in the provinces of Holland, Zeeland, and Utrecht, though in other provinces that office was filled by members of the House of Nassau-Dietz (later called Orange-Nassau) during various periods.

During the period, the Republic lost its Great-Power status and its primacy in world trade, processes that went hand-in-hand, the latter causing the former. Though the economy declined considerably, causing deindustrialization and deurbanization in the maritime provinces, a rentier-class kept accumulating a large capital fund that formed the basis for the leading position the Republic achieved in the international capital market. A military crisis at the end of the period caused the Orangist revolution and the restoration of the Stadtholderate in all provinces.

=== Economic decline after 1730 ===
The slow economic decline after 1730 was relative: other countries grew faster, eroding the Dutch lead and surpassing it. Wilson identifies three causes. Holland lost its world dominance in trade as competitors emerged and copied its practices, built their own ships and ports, and traded on their own account directly without going through Dutch intermediaries. Second, there was no growth in manufacturing, due perhaps to a weaker sense of industrial entrepreneurship and to the high wage scale. Third the wealthy turned their investments to foreign loans. This helped jump-start other nations and provided the Dutch with a steady income from collecting interest, but leaving them with few domestic sectors with a potential for rapid growth.

After the Dutch fleet declined, merchant interests became dependent on the goodwill of Britain. The main focus of Dutch leaders was reducing the country's considerable budget deficits. Dutch trade and shipping remained at a fairly steady level through the 18th century, but no longer had a near monopoly and also could not match growing British and French competition. The Netherlands lost its position as the trading centre of Northern Europe to Britain.

Although the Netherlands remained wealthy, investments for the nation's money became more difficult to find. Some investment went into purchases of land for estates, but most went to foreign bonds and Amsterdam remained one of Europe's banking capitals.

=== Culture and society ===
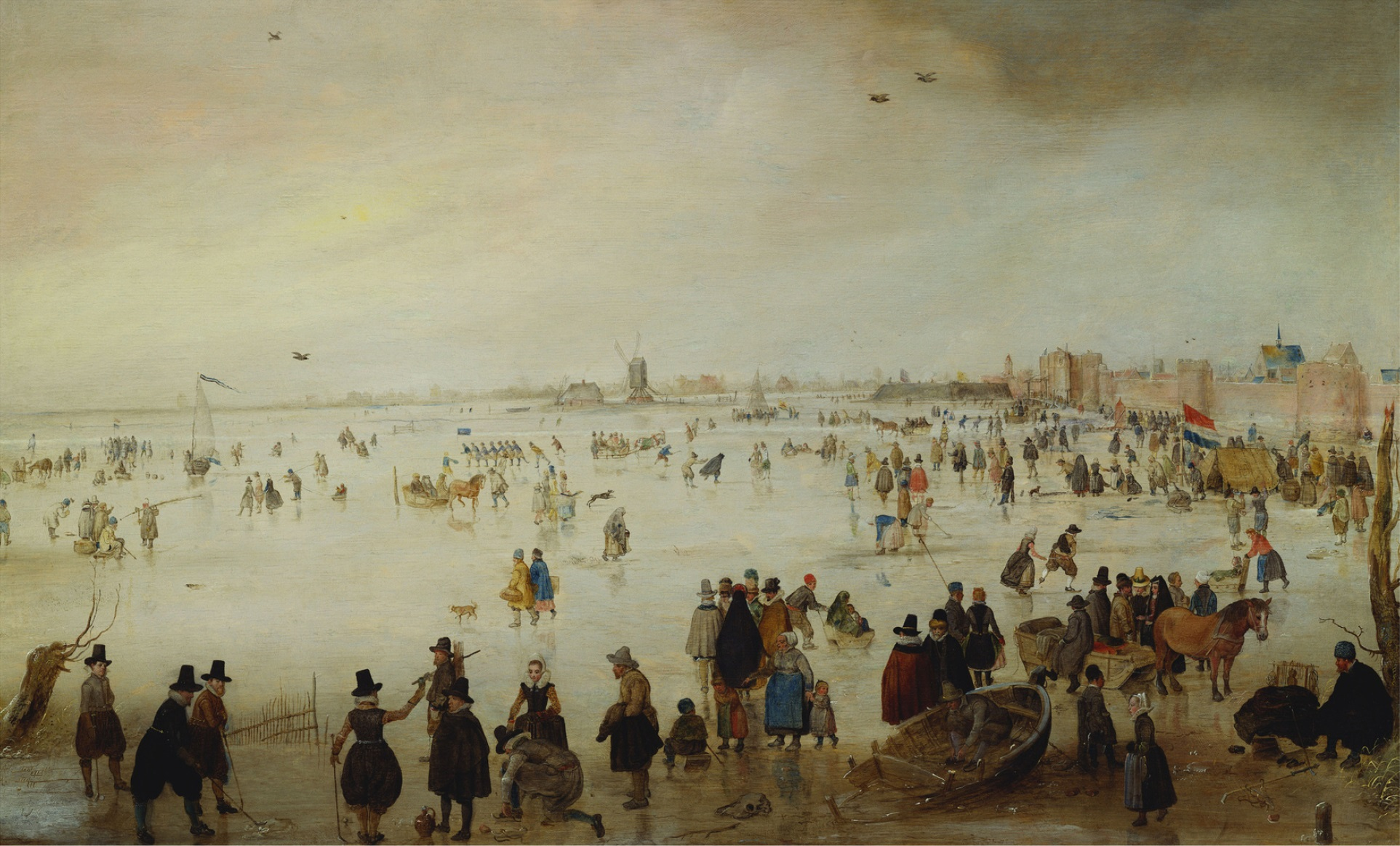
Winter landscape with skaters near the city of Kampen, by Hendrick Avercamp

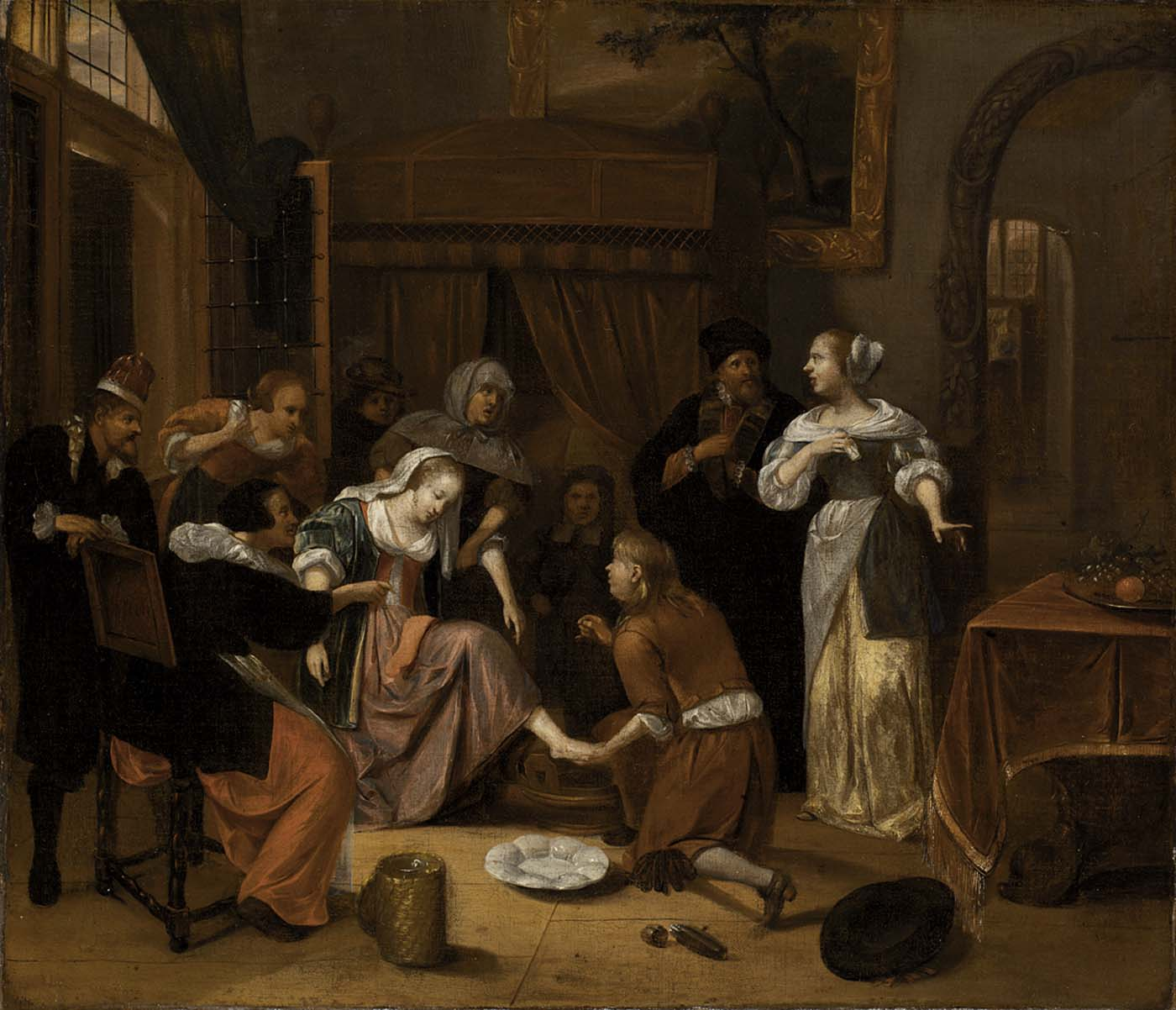
The Doctor's Visit , by Jan Steen

Dutch culture also declined both in the arts and sciences. Literature for example largely imitated English and French styles with little in the way of innovation or originality. The most influential intellectual was Pierre Bayle (1647–1706), a Protestant refugee from France who settled in Rotterdam where he wrote the massive Dictionnaire Historique et Critique (Historical and Critical Dictionary, 1696). It had a major impact on the thinking of The Enlightenment across Europe, giving an arsenal of weapons to critics who wanted to attack religion. It was an encyclopaedia of ideas that argued that most "truths" were merely opinions, and that gullibility and stubbornness were prevalent. Religious life became more relaxed as well. Catholics grew from 18% to 23% of the population during the 18th century and enjoyed greater tolerance, even as they continued to be outside the political system. They became divided by the feud between moralistic Jansenists (who denied free will) and orthodox believers. One group of Jansenists formed a splinter sect, the Old Catholic Church in 1723. The upper classes willingly embraced the ideas of the Enlightenment, tempered by the tolerance that meant less hostility to organized religion compared to France.

Dutch universities declined in importance, no longer attracting large numbers of foreign students. The Netherlands remained an important hub of intellectual exchange, creating reviews of foreign publications that made scholars aware of new works in French, German, and English. Dutch painting declined, no longer being innovative, with painters pursuing the styles of the old masters.

Life for the average Dutchman became slower and more relaxed in the 18th century. The upper and middle classes continued to enjoy prosperity and high living standards. The drive to succeed seemed less urgent. Unskilled laborers remained locked in poverty and hardship. The large underclass of unemployed required government and private charity to survive.

=== The Orangist revolution (1747–1751) ===
Stadtholderates of William IV and William V
- 1747–1795
Second Stadtholderless Period	Batavian Republic

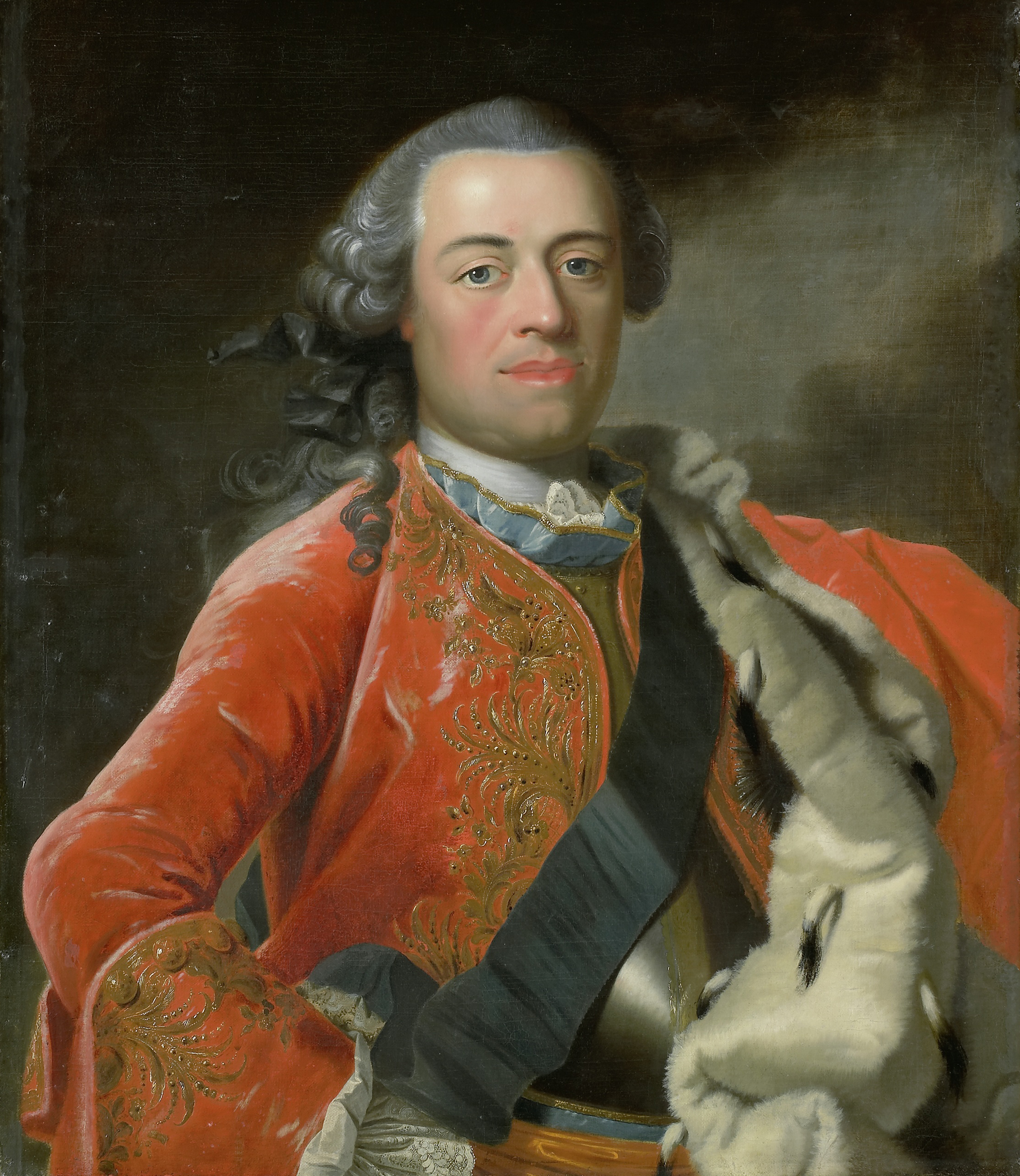
William IV, Prince of Orange, stadholder from 1747 to 1751 CE

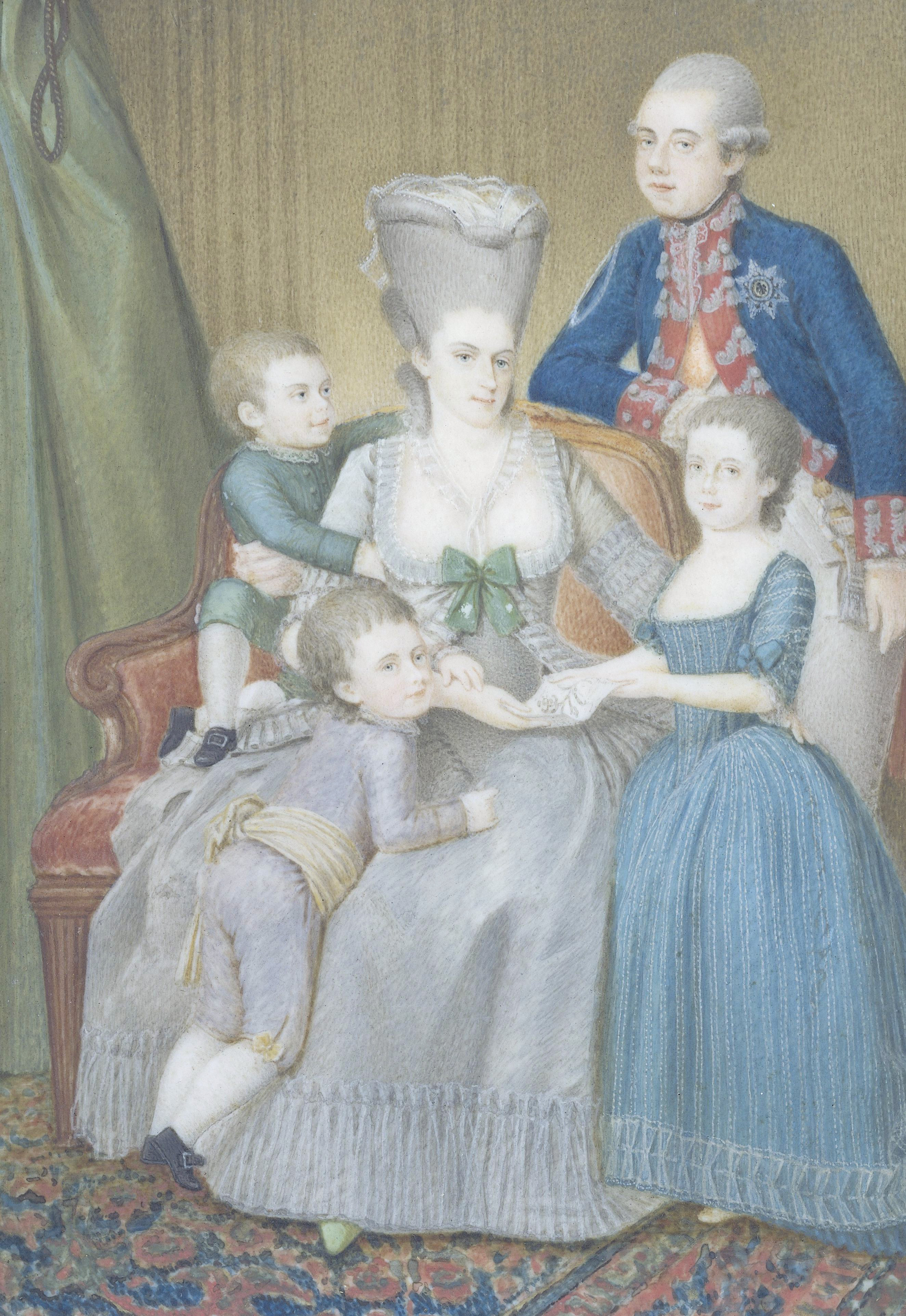
Willem V of Orange, stadholder from 1751 to 1806, and Wilhelmina of Prussia with three of their five children. From left to right: the future William I of the Netherlands, Frederick, and Frederica Louise Wilhelmina.

During Anthonie van der Heim's tenure as Grand Pensionary (1737–1746), the Dutch Republic was reluctantly drawn into the War of Austrian Succession, despite efforts to remain neutral. French attacks on Dutch fortresses in the Austrian Netherlands and occupation of the Dutch Zeelandic Flanders led to the Republic joining the Quadruple Alliance, which suffered a significant defeat at the Battle of Fontenoy. The French invasion exposed the weaknesses of Dutch defenses, leading to memories of "Disaster Year" of 1672 and widespread calls for the restoration of the stadtholderate. William IV, Prince of Orange, seized this opportunity to consolidate power and place loyal officials in strategic government positions to wrest control from the regenten. The struggle involved religious, anti-Catholic, and democratic elements, as well as mob violence and political agitation. The war concluded with the Treaty of Aix-la-Chapelle (1748), and the French voluntarily retreated from the Dutch frontier. However, William IV died unexpectedly in 1751 at the age of 40.

=== Regency and indolent rule (1752–1779) ===
His son, William V, was 3 years old when his father died, and a long regency characterised by corruption and misrule began. His mother delegated most of the powers of the regency to Bentinck and her favorite, Duke Louis Ernest of Brunswick-Lüneburg. All power was concentrated in the hands of an unaccountable few, including the Frisian nobleman Douwe Sirtema van Grovestins. Still a teenager, William V assumed the position of stadtholder in 1766, the last to hold that office. In 1767, he married Princess Wilhelmina of Prussia, the daughter of Augustus William of Prussia, niece of Frederick the Great.

The position of the Dutch during the American War of Independence (1775–1783) was one of neutrality. William V, leading the pro-British faction within the government, blocked attempts by anti-Orangist, and later pro-French, elements to drag the government to war. However, things came to a head with the Dutch attempt to join the Russian-led League of Armed Neutrality, leading to the outbreak of the disastrous Fourth Anglo-Dutch War in 1780. After the signing of the Treaty of Paris (1783), the impoverished nation grew restless under William's rule.

An English historian summed him up uncharitably as "a Prince of the profoundest lethargy and most abysmal stupidity." And yet he would guide his family through the difficult French-Batavian period and his son would be crowned king.

=== Fourth Anglo-Dutch War (1780–1784) ===
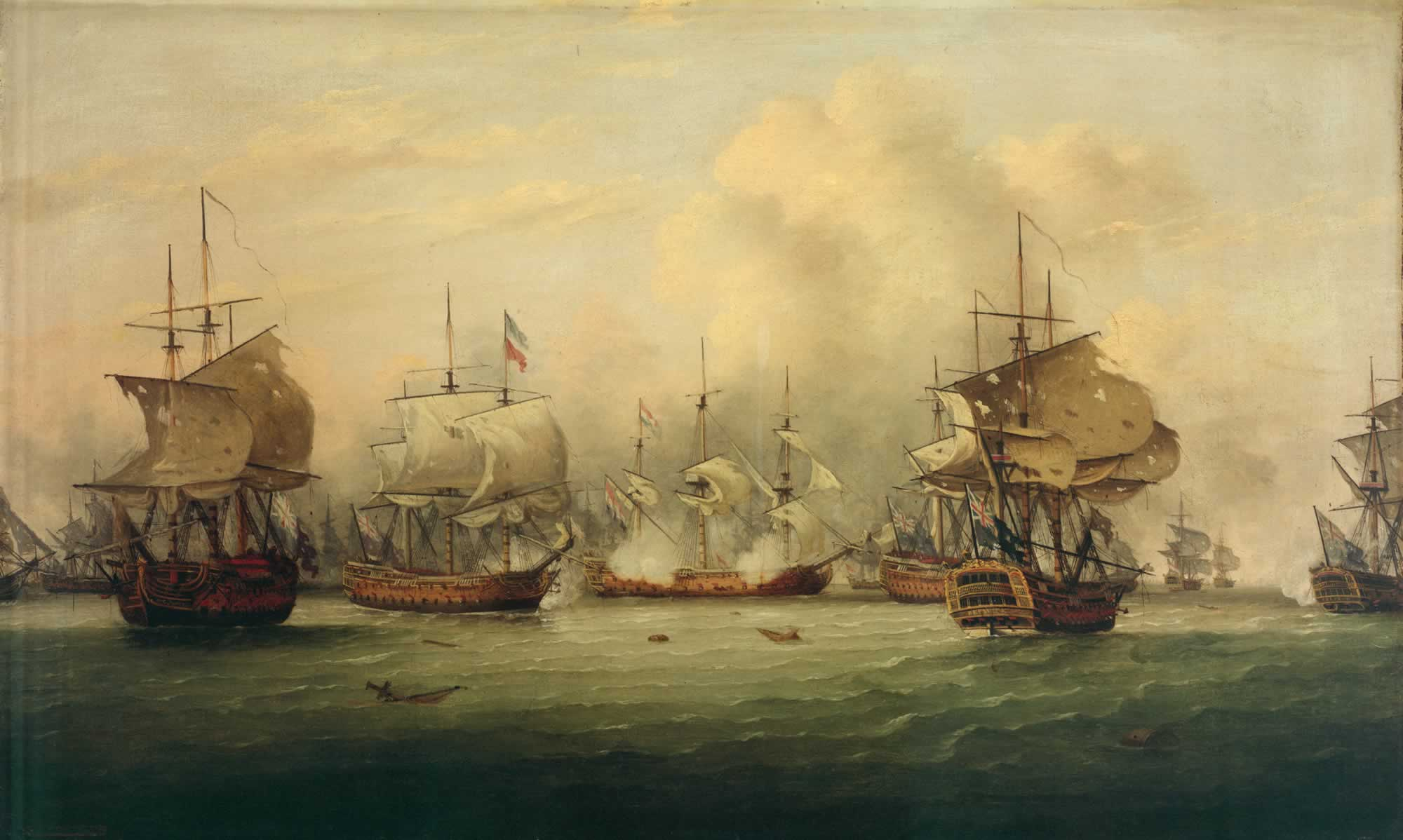
Battle of Dogger Bank (1781) by Thomas Luny

The Fourth Anglo–Dutch War (1780–1784) was a conflict between the Kingdom of Great Britain and the Dutch Republic. The war, tangentially related to the American Revolutionary War, broke out over British and Dutch disagreements on the legality and conduct of Dutch trade with Britain's enemies in that war.

Although the Dutch Republic did not enter into a formal alliance with the United States and their allies, U.S. ambassador (and future President) John Adams managed to establish diplomatic relations with the Dutch Republic, making it the second European country to diplomatically recognize the Continental Congress in April 1782. In October 1782, a treaty of amity and commerce was concluded as well.

Most of the war consisted of a series of largely successful British operations against Dutch colonial economic interests, although British and Dutch naval forces also met once off the Dutch coast. The war ended disastrously for the Dutch and exposed the weakness of the political and economic foundations of the country. The Treaty of Paris (1784), according to Fernand Braudel, "sounded the knell of Dutch greatness."

=== Patriot rebellion and its suppression (1785–1795) ===
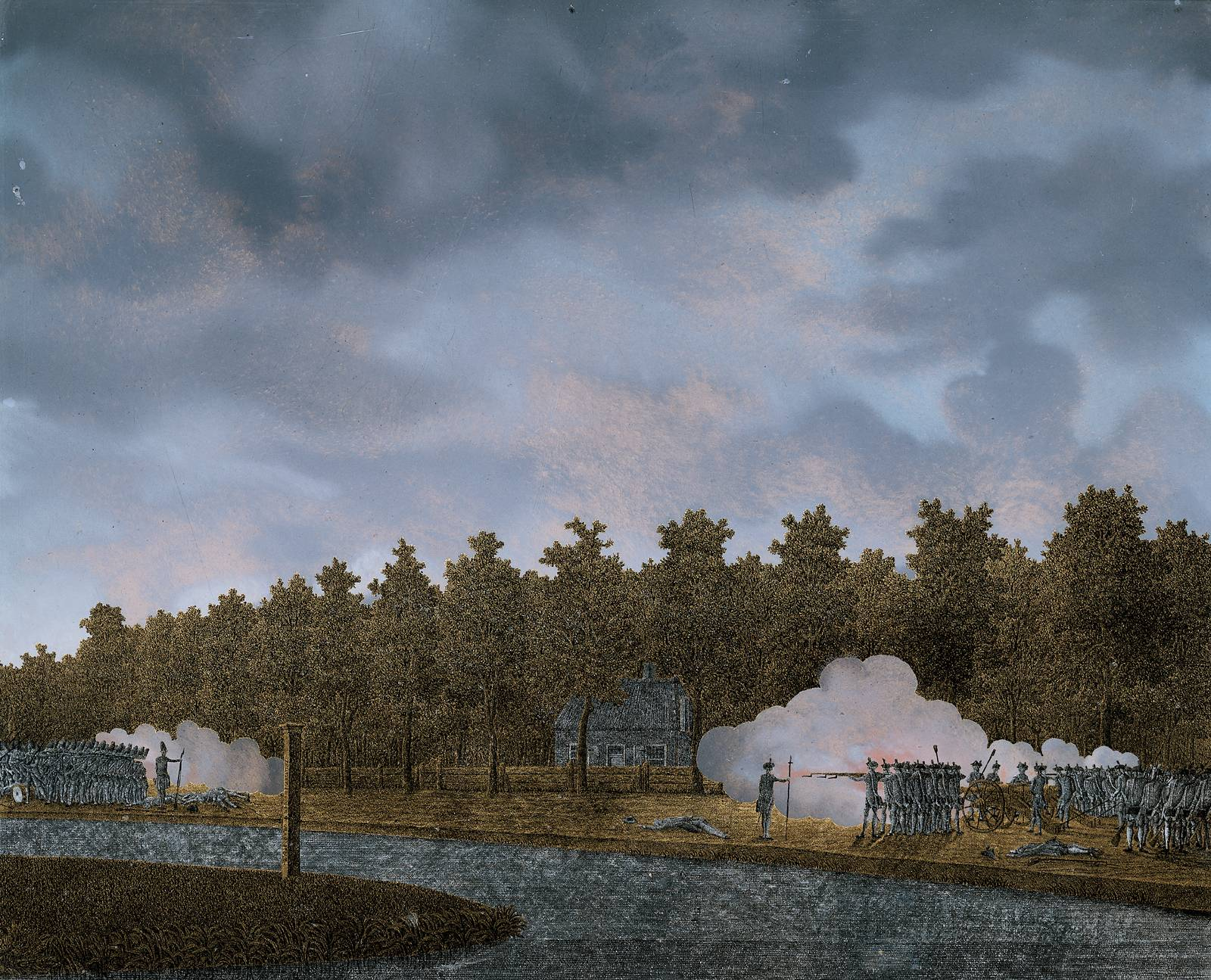
Firefight on the Vaartse Rijn at Jutphaas on 9 May 1787. The pro-revolutionary Utrecht Patriots are on the right; the troops of stadholder William V, Prince of Orange on the left. (Painted by Jonas Zeuner, 1787)

After the war with Great Britain ended disastrously in 1784, there was growing unrest and a rebellion by the anti-Orangist Patriots. Influenced by the American Revolution, the Patriots sought a more democratic form of government. The opening shot of this revolution is often considered to be the 1781 publication of a manifesto called Aan het Volk van Nederland ("To the People of the Netherlands") by Joan van der Capellen tot den Pol, who would become an influential leader of the Patriot movement. Their aim was to reduce corruption and the power held by the stadtholder, William V, Prince of Orange.

Support for the Patriots came mostly from the middle class. They formed militias called exercitiegenootschappen. In 1785, there was an open Patriot rebellion, which took the form of an armed insurrection by local militias in certain Dutch towns, Freedom being the rallying cry. Herman Willem Daendels attempted to organise an overthrow of various municipal governments (vroedschap). The goal was to oust government officials and force new elections. "Seen as a whole this revolution was a string of violent and confused events, accidents, speeches, rumours, bitter enmities and armed confrontations", wrote French historian Fernand Braudel, who saw it as a forerunner of the French Revolution. The Patriot movement focused more on local political power, where they had no say in their towns' governance. Although they were able to curtail the power of the stadholder, and hold democratic elections in select towns, they were divided in their political vision, which was more local than national. Supporters were drawn from religious dissenters and Catholics in particular places, while pro-stadholder Orangists had more widespread geographical support of sections of the lower classes, the Dutch Reformed clergy, and the Jewish community.

In 1785 the stadholder left The Hague and moved his court to Nijmegen in Guelders, a city remote from the heart of Dutch political life. In June 1787, his energetic wife Wilhelmina (the sister of Frederick William II of Prussia) tried to travel to The Hague. Outside Schoonhoven, she was stopped by Patriot militiamen and taken to a farm near Goejanverwellesluis. She was forced to return to Nijmegen. She appealed to her brother for help, and he sent some 26,000 troops to invade, led by Charles William Ferdinand, Duke of Brunswick, to suppress the rebellion. The Patriot militias could not contend with these forces, melting away. Dutch banks at this time still held much of the world's capital. Government-sponsored banks owned up to 40% of Great Britain's national debt and there were close connections to the House of Stuart. The stadholder had supported British policies after the American Revolution and in foreign policy, the stadholder was "little more than a pawn of the British and Prussians", so that Patriot pressure was ignored by William.

This severe military response overwhelmed the Patriots and put the stadholder firmly back in control. A small unpaid Prussian army was billeted in the Netherlands and supported themselves by looting and extortion. The exercitiegenootschappen continued urging citizens to resist the government. They distributed pamphlets, formed "Patriot Clubs" and held public demonstrations. The government responded by pillaging those towns where opposition continued. Five leaders were sentenced to death, forcing them to flee. Lynchings also occurred. For a while, no one dared appear in public without an orange cockade to show their support for Orangism. Many Patriots, perhaps around 40,000 in all, fled to Brabant, France (especially Dunkirk and St. Omer) and elsewhere. Before long the French became involved in Dutch politics and the tide turned toward the Patriots.

The French Revolution was popular, and numerous underground clubs were promoting it when in January 1795 the French army invaded. The underground rose up, overthrew the municipal and provincial governments, and proclaimed the Batavian Republic in Amsterdam. Stadtholder William V fled to England and the States General dissolved itself.

== Economy ==
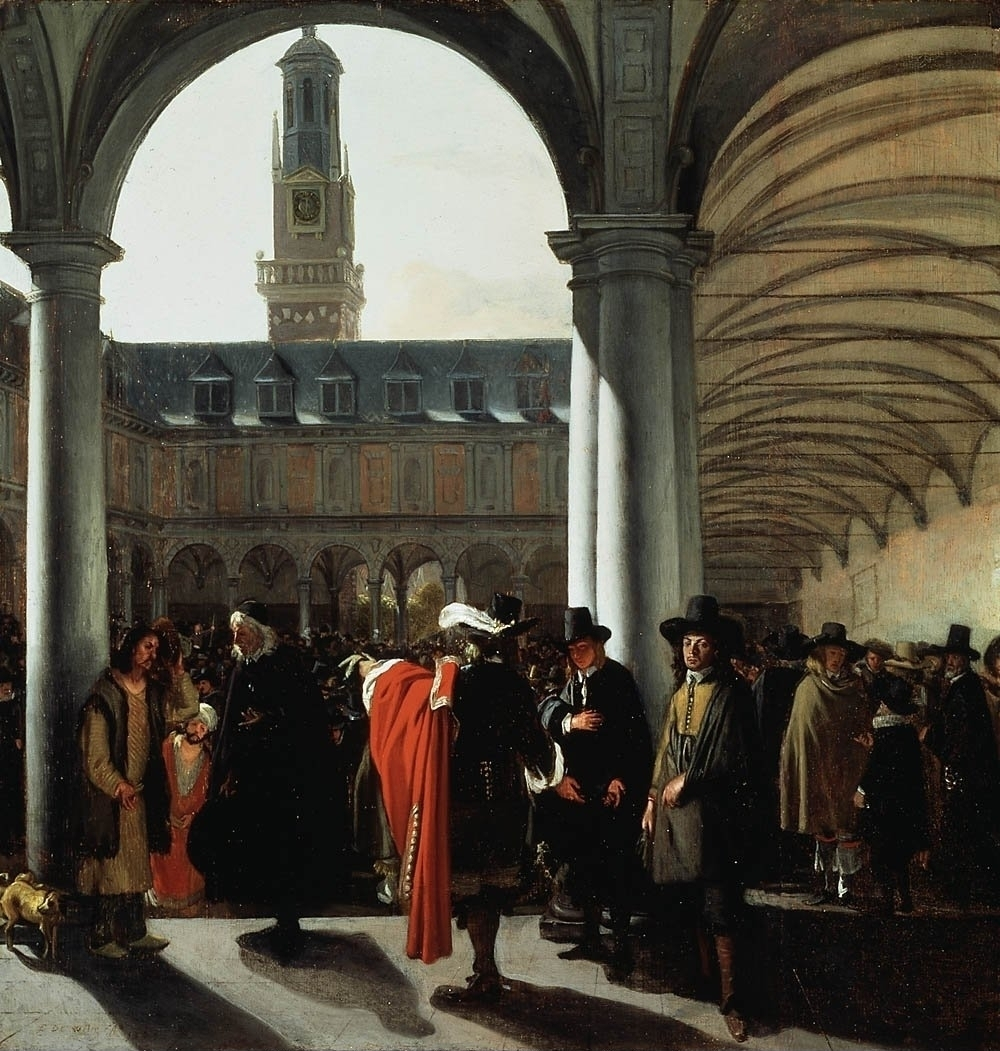
Amsterdam Stock Exchange courtyard, 1653

During the Dutch Golden Age in the late-16th and 17th centuries, the Dutch Republic dominated world trade, conquering a vast colonial empire and operating the largest fleet of merchantmen of any nation. When Southern Europe was experiencing poor harvests, the Dutch very profitably exported surplus grain from Poland. The County of Holland was the wealthiest and most urbanized region in the world. In 1650 the urban population of the Dutch Republic as a percentage of total population was 31.7 percent, while that of the Spanish Netherlands was 20.8 percent, of Portugal 16.6 percent, and of Italy 14 percent. In 1675 the urban population density of Holland alone was 61 percent, compared to the rest of the Dutch Republic, where 27 percent lived in urban areas.

The free trade spirit of the time was augmented by the development of a modern, effective stock market in the Low Countries. The Netherlands has the oldest stock exchange in the world, founded in 1602 by the Dutch East India Company, while Rotterdam has the oldest bourse in the Netherlands. The Dutch East-India Company exchange went public in six different cities. Later, a court ruled that the company had to reside legally in a single city, so Amsterdam is recognized as the oldest such institution based on modern trading principles. While the banking system evolved in the Low Countries, it was quickly incorporated by the well-connected English, stimulating English economic output.

== Politics ==
The republic was a confederation of seven provinces, which had their own governments and were very independent, and a number of so-called Generality Lands. The latter were governed directly by the States General, the federal government. The States General were seated in The Hague and consisted of representatives of each of the seven provinces. The provinces of the republic were, in official feudal order:

1. Duchy of Guelders (corresponding to the modern province of Gelderland)
2. County of Holland (corresponding to the modern provinces of North Holland and South Holland)
3. County of Zeeland (corresponding to the modern province of Zeeland)
4. Lordship of Utrecht (corresponding to the modern province of Utrecht)
5. Lordship of Overijssel (corresponding to the modern province of Overijssel)
6. Lordship of Frisia (corresponding to the modern province of Friesland)
7. Lordship of Groningen (corresponding to the modern province of Groningen)

There was an eighth province, the County of Drenthe (corresponding to the modern province of Drenthe), but this area was so poor that it was exempt from paying federal taxes, and as a consequence, it was denied representation in the States General, which is why the official name of the state was the "Seven United Netherlands" and not the "Eight United Netherlands".

Each province was governed by the Provincial States, their main executive official (though not the official head of state) being a raadpensionaris or landsadvocaat. In times of war, the stadtholder, who commanded the army, would have more power than the raadpensionaris. In theory, the stadtholders were freely appointed by and subordinate to the states of each province. However, in practice the princes of Orange of the House of Orange-Nassau, beginning with William the Silent, were always chosen as stadtholders of most of the provinces.

Zeeland and usually Utrecht had the same stadtholder as Holland. There was a constant power struggle between the Orangists, who supported the stadtholders and specifically the princes of Orange, and the Republicans, who supported the States General and hoped to replace the semi-hereditary nature of the stadtholdership with a true republican structure.

After the Peace of Westphalia, several border territories were assigned to the United Provinces. They were federally governed Generality Lands. These were Staats-Brabant, Staats-Vlaanderen, Staats-Overmaas, and (after the Treaty of Utrecht) Staats-Opper-Gelre. The States General of the United Provinces were in control of the Dutch East India Company and the Dutch West India Company, but some shipping expeditions were initiated by some of the provinces, mostly Holland and Zeeland.

The framers of the United States Constitution were influenced by the Constitution of the Republic of the United Provinces, as Federalist No. 20, by James Madison, shows. The United States did not intend to emulate the United Provinces; Madison describes the Dutch confederacy as exhibiting "Imbecility in the government; discord among the provinces; foreign influence and indignities; a precarious existence in peace, and peculiar calamities from war." However, the 1776 American Declaration of Independence is similar to the 1581 Act of Abjuration, essentially the declaration of independence of the United Provinces, although there is no evidence of direct influence.

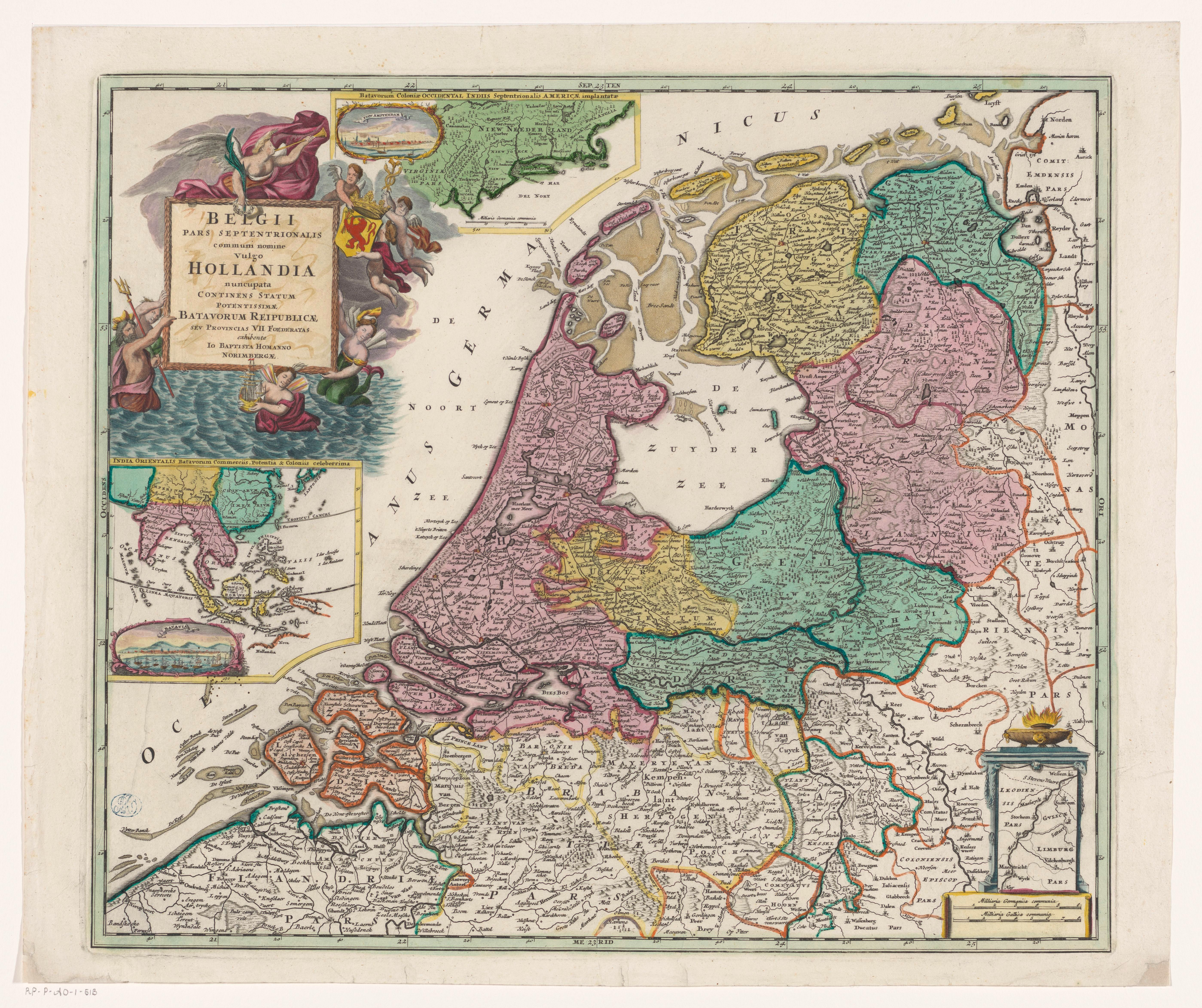
Map of the Republic of the Seven United Netherlands with colonies, c. 1707–1729

The united provinces, with Drenthe and the Generality Lands

== Religion ==
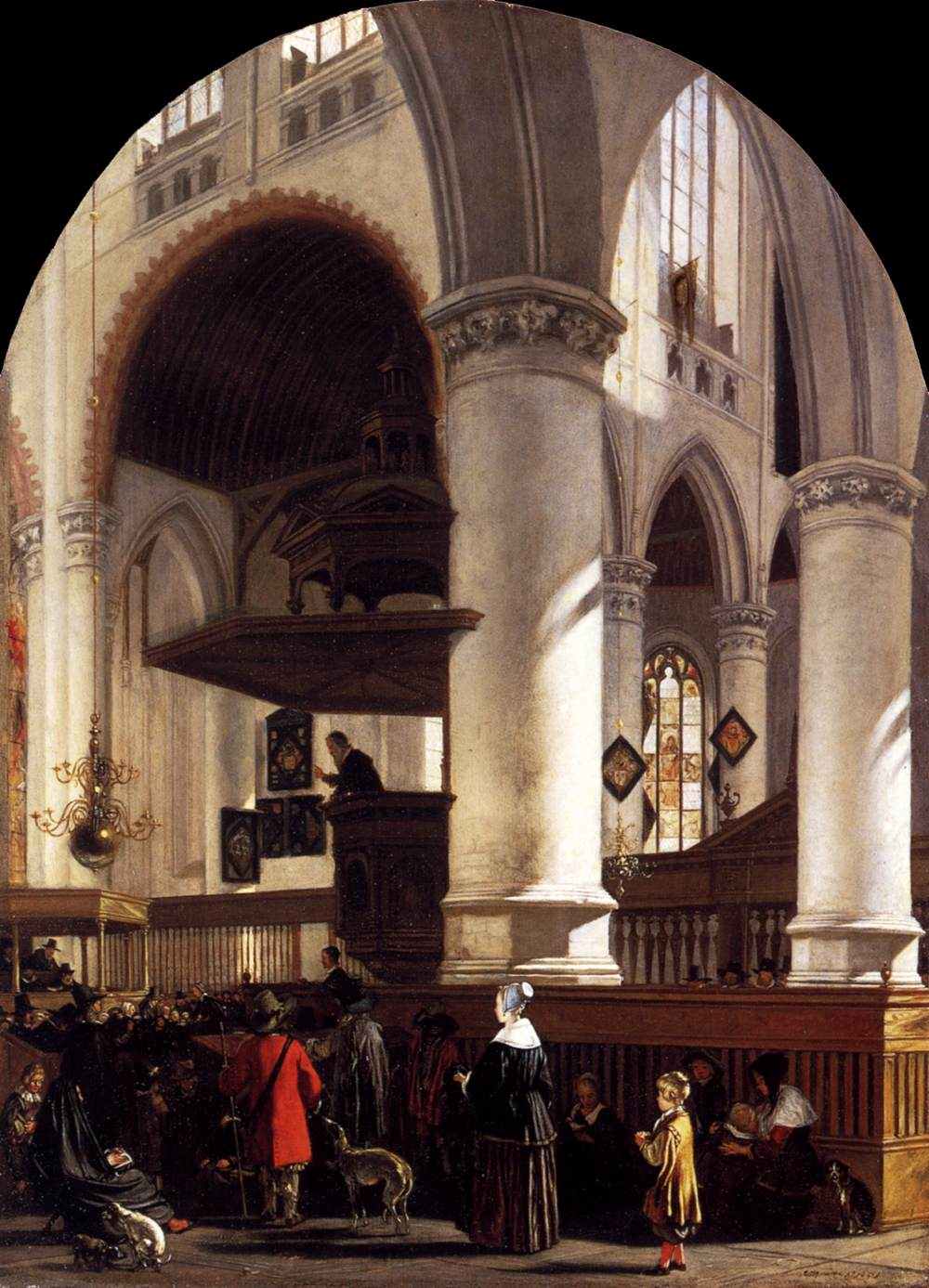
Sermon at the Oude Kerk at Delft, 1651

In the Union of Utrecht of 20 January 1579, Holland and Zeeland were granted the right to accept only one religion (in practice, Calvinism). Every other province had the freedom to regulate the religious question as it wished, although the Union stated every person should be free in the choice of personal religion and that no person should be prosecuted based on religious choice. William of Orange had been a strong supporter of public and personal freedom of religion and hoped to unite Protestants and Catholics in the new union, and, for him, the Union was a defeat. In practice, Catholic services in all provinces were quickly forbidden, and the Dutch Reformed Church became the "public" or "privileged" church in the republic.

During the republic, any person who wished to hold public office had to conform to the Reformed Church and take an oath to this effect. The extent to which different religions or denominations were persecuted depended much on the time period and regional or city leaders. In the beginning, this was especially focused on Roman Catholics, being the religion of the enemy. In 17th-century Leiden, for instance, people opening their homes to services could be fined 200 guilders (a year's wage for a skilled tradesman) and banned from the city. Throughout this, however, personal freedom of religion existed and was one factor—along with economic reasons—in causing large immigration of religious refugees from other parts of Europe.

In the first years of the republic, controversy arose within the Reformed Church, mainly around the subject of predestination. This has become known as the struggle between Arminianism and Gomarism, or between Remonstrants and Contra-Remonstrants. In 1618, the Synod of Dort tackled this issue, which led to the banning of the Remonstrant faith.

Beginning in the 18th century, the situation changed from more or less active persecution of religious services to a state of restricted toleration of other religions, as long as their services took place secretly in private churches.

== Decline ==
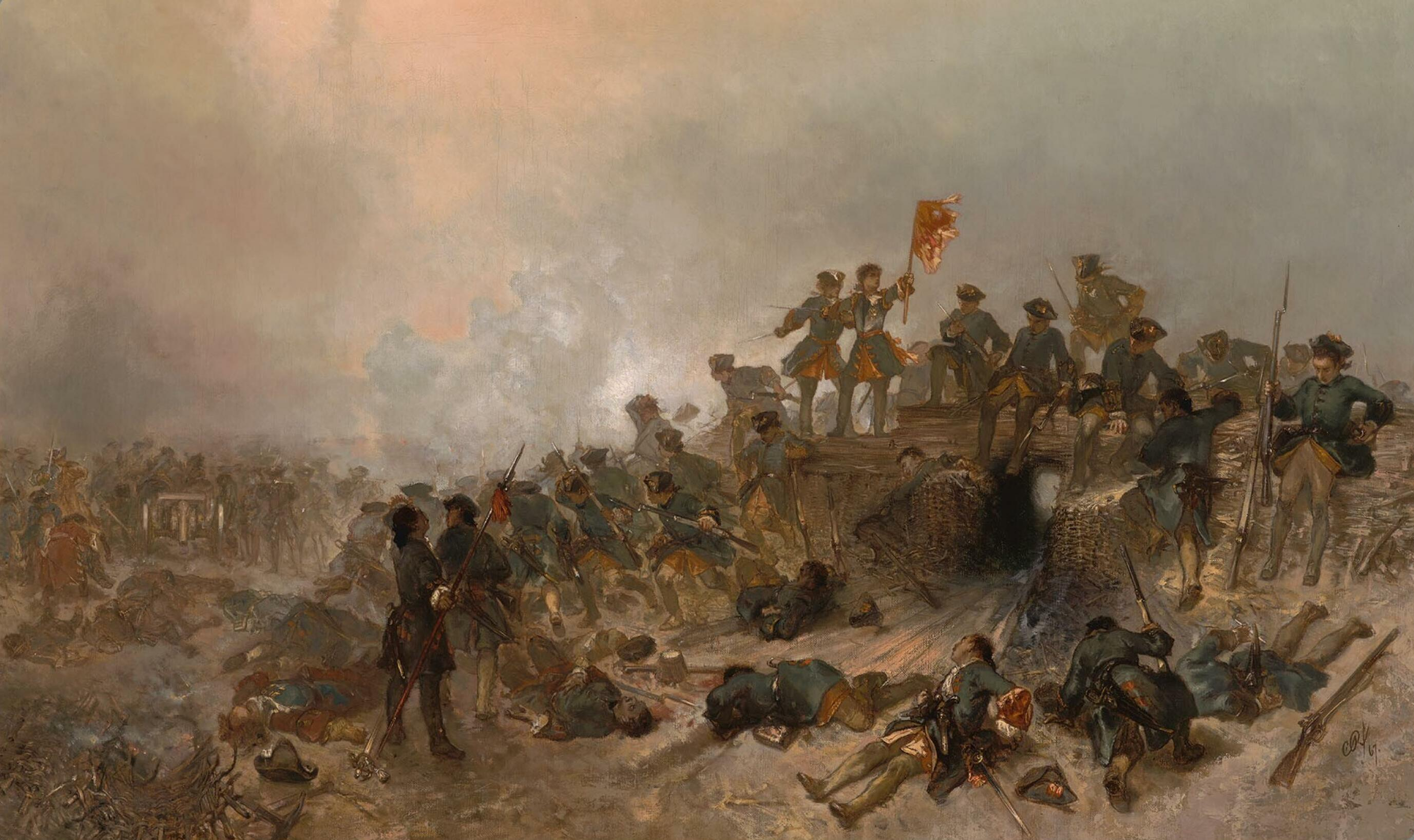
Dutch troops led by the Prince of Orange assault the French at the battle of Malplaquet

Long-term rivalry between the two main factions in Dutch society, the Staatsgezinden (Republicans, Dutch States Party) and the Prinsgezinden (Royalists or Orangists), sapped the strength and unity of the country. Johan de Witt and the Republicans did reign supreme for a time at the middle of the 17th century (the First Stadtholderless Period) until his overthrow and murder in 1672. Subsequently, William III of Orange became stadtholder. After a 22-year stadtholderless era, the Orangists regained power, and his first problem was to survive the Franco-Dutch War (with the derivative Third Anglo-Dutch War), when France, England, Münster, and Cologne united against his country.

Wars to contain the expansionist policies of France in various coalitions after the Glorious Revolution burdened the republic with huge debts, although little of the fighting after 1673 took place on Dutch territory. The necessity to maintain a vast army against France meant that less money could be spent on the navy, weakening the republic's economy. After William III's death in 1702 the Second Stadtholderless Period was inaugurated. Despite having contributed much in the War of the Spanish Succession, the Dutch Republic gained little from the peace talks in Utrecht (1713). However, the Dutch had over a period of forty years successfully defended their positions in the Southern Netherlands and their troops were central in the alliances which had halted French territorial expansion in Europe until 1792. The end of the War of the Austrian Succession in 1748, and Austria becoming allies with France against Prussia, marked the end of the republic as a major military power.

Fierce competition for trade and colonies, especially from France and England, furthered the economic downturn of the country. The three Anglo-Dutch Wars and the rise of mercantilism had a negative effect on Dutch shipping and commerce.

== See also ==
- List of countries that have gained independence from Spain
- Dutch colonial empire
- Dutch East India Company
- Dutch West India Company
