= Siege of Medemblik (1588) =

- Part of the Eighty Years' War
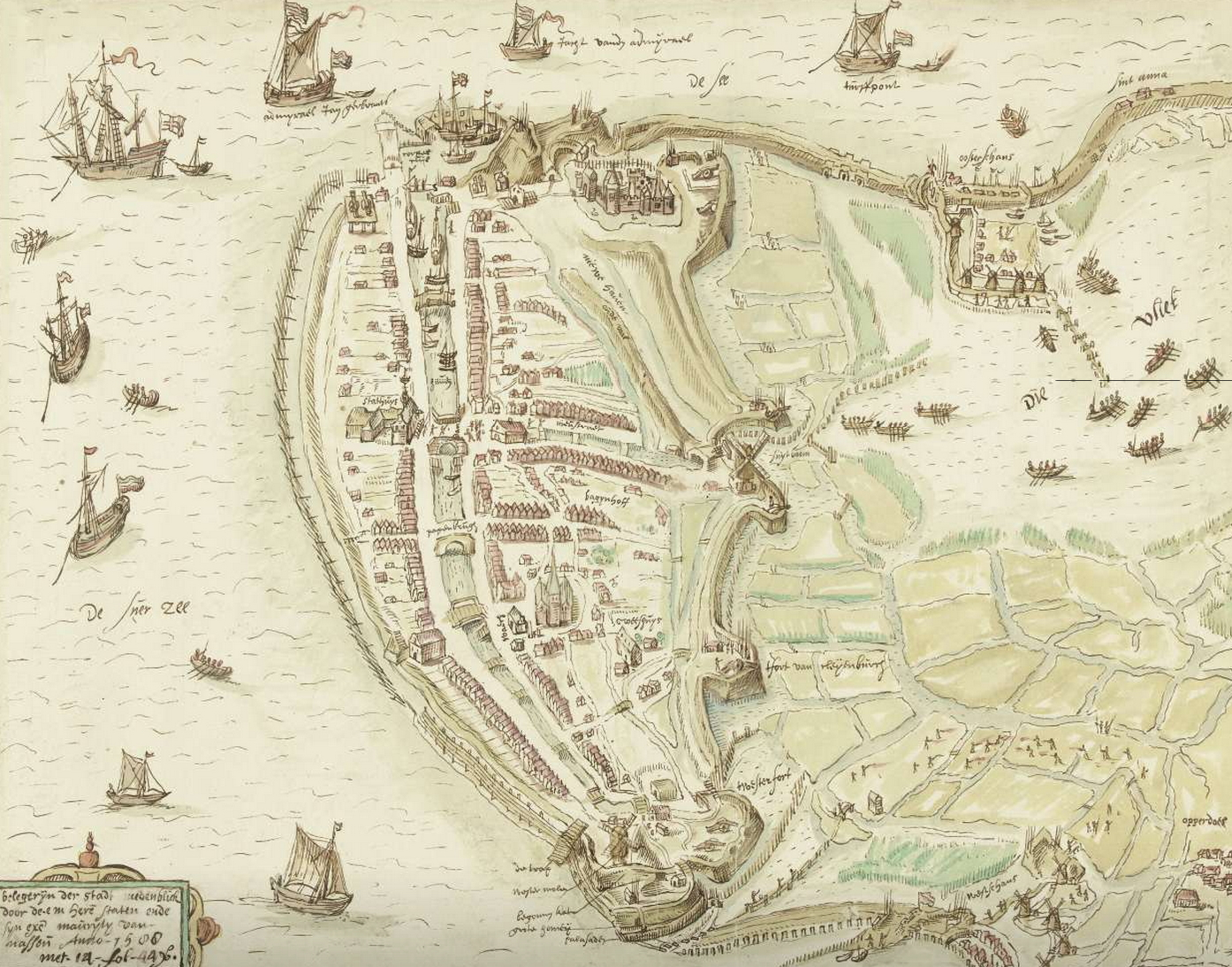
Date	February 27 - April 29, 1588
Location	Medemblik, County of Holland
Result	Dutch States Party victory: Medemblik is ceded to Maurice, Prince of Orange.

Belligerents
Dutch States Party	England

Commanders and leaders
Maurice, Prince of Orange	Diederik Sonoy

The Siege of Medemblik was a siege of the city of Medemblik by Prince Maurice on behalf of the States of Holland against the rebellious commander of this city, Diederik Sonoy, who was assisted by English soldiers during the Eighty Years' War.

== Approach ==
Diederik Sonoy was commander in Medemblik who had sworn an oath to the Earl of Leicester. After Maurice was appointed Stadtholder, Sonoy refused to swear an oath to Maurice. Meanwhile, a mutiny broke out among his soldiers, which also spread to other cities. These soldiers demanded the full payment of their outstanding wages . He managed to calm the situation but had withdrawn to Radboud Castle as a precaution. In the meantime, the States had grown suspicious of him, for Sonoy had, after all, brought 450 more men into Medemblik than he had been ordered to do. Visits by representatives of the States and even by Maurice himself led to nothing. Sonoy and his men invoked an oath they had previously sworn to the Earl of Leicester. The distrust of Sonoy increased even further after it became apparent that he had had six barrels of gunpowder brought to the city from Amsterdam.

== Topping ==
When Maurice and the States General were convinced that Sonoy intended to fortify himself within the city, they found themselves compelled to take the city by force. Maurice, together with Johan van Oldenbarnevelt and other lords, marched to Medemblik via Hoorn. In Hoorn, Maurice managed to drive one of Sonoy's companies out of the city. On February 27, Maurice arrived before Medemblik. In the meantime, Bardens, mayor of Amsterdam, was present there by order of the Council of State to mediate with Sonoy. When these mediations made no progress, Maurices' troops began placing fortifications along the access roads. During the placement of these fortifications, shots were sometimes fired back and forth. The city was also occasionally fired upon from several warships lying in the harbor. Meanwhile, Sonoy was counting on reinforcements from Charles Howard, who, according to a letter from Daniel de Dieu, a minister from Vlissingen, was en route with eight large ships and six pinnaces to relieve him. Sonoy's companies from Harderwijk and Kampen were also to support him in this. However, the couriers had fallen into Maurice's hands. Maurice tried in vain to breach the dikes due to resistance offered from Medemblik. Sonoy showed the letters from England, from which his supporters drew strength. But then Sonoy received a letter stating that the Earl of Leicester had renounced his rule in the Netherlands, as a result of which Sonoy was released from his oath to the Earl.

== Aftermath ==
Following this, on April 29, Sonoy sat down at the negotiating table with Maurice again, under the mediation of the English warlord Willoughby. This resulted in a treaty stipulating that Sonoy could remain within Medemblik, but with the agreed number of soldiers, and was not permitted to undertake new projects independently. Furthermore, Sonoy was given the choice between a proper service order or a fair discharge. With this, peace seemed to have returned to the city, but this proved to be short-lived. During that time as commander in the city, Sonoy had incurred the hatred of the citizens of Medemblik, and for a considerable period, he had been unable to walk the streets without endangering his own life. He had ruled there with an iron fist. He had also frequently clashed with the aldermen, who regularly gathered in front of the castle and shouted all kinds of insults at it. Because of these circumstances, Sonoy offered his resignation, which was granted to him in exchange for a reward of 1,000 pounds in annual pay. Sonoy subsequently moved to the manor of Dijksterhuis near the village of Pieterburen, in the Ommelanden.
