= Gewest =

Historical regional subdivision of the Netherlands

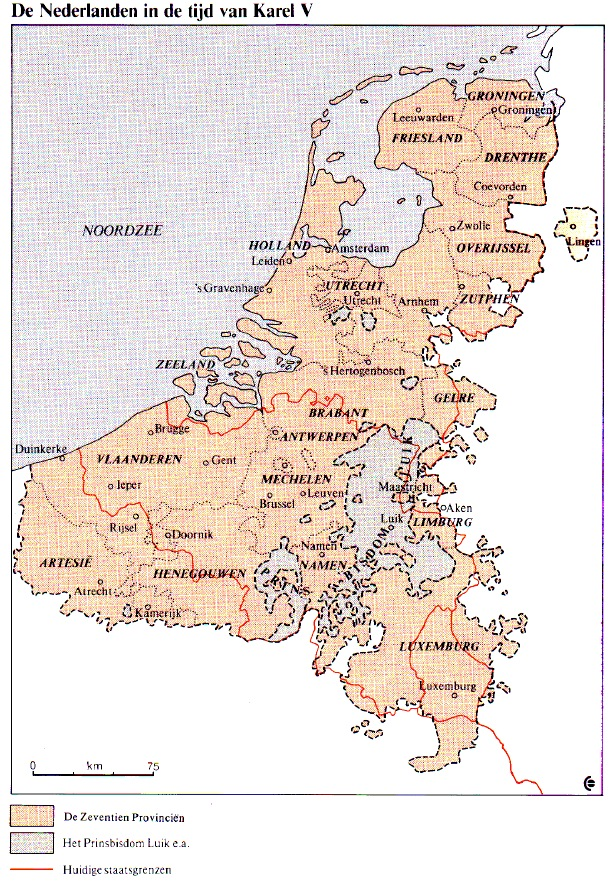
The seventeen Gewesten of the Low Countries in the 16th century. Also known as the Seventeen Provinces

Gewest is a Dutch term often translated as "region". It was used to describe the various different polities making up the Low Countries, which covered what is now the Netherlands, Belgium, Luxembourg and parts of northern France, until the annexation by France in the late 18th century. The term is now mostly associated with the official titles of the constituent states of Belgium.

== Middle Ages ==
The Low Countries were made up of different polities which gradually united under foreign rule. First under the Duchy of Burgundy, then under the Spanish Empire, and later under Austria before being invaded by France where the polities were abolished and replaced by departements which in turn were replaced by provinces with the establishment of the United Kingdom of the Netherlands.

In the mid-16th century, under Emperor Charles V, the Habsburg Low Countries consisted of seventeen Gewesten. This collection of polities was also known as the Seventeen Provinces. However, this was not a fixed number, but it was kept due to the significance of the number seventeen in the Christian religion. The representatives of these territories often gathered in what was called the States-General or Staten-Generaal.

The polities making up the Low Countries differed in structure. Examples of titles for some of the territories were Duchy, County, Burgraviate and Lordship. Here Gewest is often used as a catch-all term for all these different polities.

The Gewesten of the Low Countries under Spanish rule were:

- County of Artois
- County of Flanders
- Burgraviates of Walloon Flanders (Lille–Douai–Orchies)
- Burgraviate of Tournaisis
- Lordship of Mechelen
- County of Namur
- County of Hainaut
- County of Zeeland
- County of Holland
- Duchy of Brabant (incl. Margraviate of Antwerp)
- Duchy of Limburg
- Duchy of Luxemburg
- Lordship of Utrecht
- Lordship of Frisia
- Duchy of Guelders (incl. County of Zutphen)
- Lordship of Groningen
- Lordship of Overijssel (incl. County of Drenthe)

In addition to the Gewesten that fell under Habsburg rule, there were also the Prince-Bishopric of Liège and a few smaller areas which acted independently from the Empire but were still labeled as Gewesten. In fact, even before the Low Countries united through personal union with Burgundy, Dutch historians referred to the polities as Gewesten.

== Netherlands ==
=== Colonialism ===
After the dissolution of the Dutch East India Company on 31 December 1799 and its takeover by the Dutch state, government in the Dutch East Indies was exercised by the Dutch national government. The Dutch East Indies were now governed through Gewesten (Indonesian: Wilayah) which acted as provinces.

=== Stadsgewest ===
In the Netherlands, Gewest, sometimes referred to as Stadsgewest (literally "city region") is used to describe organizations made up of several urban municipalities, which are intended to carry out political and administrative tasks that transcend municipal levels.

Examples are Stadsgewest Haaglanden and Gewest Gooi en Vechtstreek.

The word Stadsgewest is also used as a Dutch synonym for urban area in both the Netherlands and Belgium.

== Belgium ==
Belgium is a federal state which encompasses three "communities" (Dutch: Gemeenschappen) and three "regions" (Dutch: Gewesten) which are based on four language areas (French, Dutch, German, bilingual). Each one of these entities has their own parliament and government, although Flemish politicians decided to officially merge the Flemish Region and the Flemish Community, with one parliament, one government and one administration, exercising both regional and community competencies.

The Belgian Gewesten came into existence through the Belgian constitutional amendment of 1980, a reform which is seen in Belgium as the official beginning of Belgian federalism. Although devolution in Belgium began before that with the reform of 1970 which established the communities.

The three regions are:

- the Brussels Capital Region (Brussels; Dutch: Brussels Hoofdstedelijk Gewest, French: Région de Bruxelles-Capitale)
- the Flemish Region (Flanders; Vlaams Gewest, Région flamande)
- the Walloon Region (Wallonia, Waalse Gewest, Région wallonne)

The Flemish Region and the Walloon Region each comprise five provinces. Although not officially labeled as a province, Brussels Capital Region holds the administrative power of both a regional government and a province.

Regions have authority in fields connected with their territory in the widest meaning of the term, thus relating to the economy, employment, agriculture, water policy, housing, public works, energy, transport, the environment, town and country planning, nature conservation, credit, and foreign trade. They supervise the provinces, municipalities and intercommunal utility companies.
