= Act of Abjuration =

1581 declaration of independence from Spain by several Dutch provinces

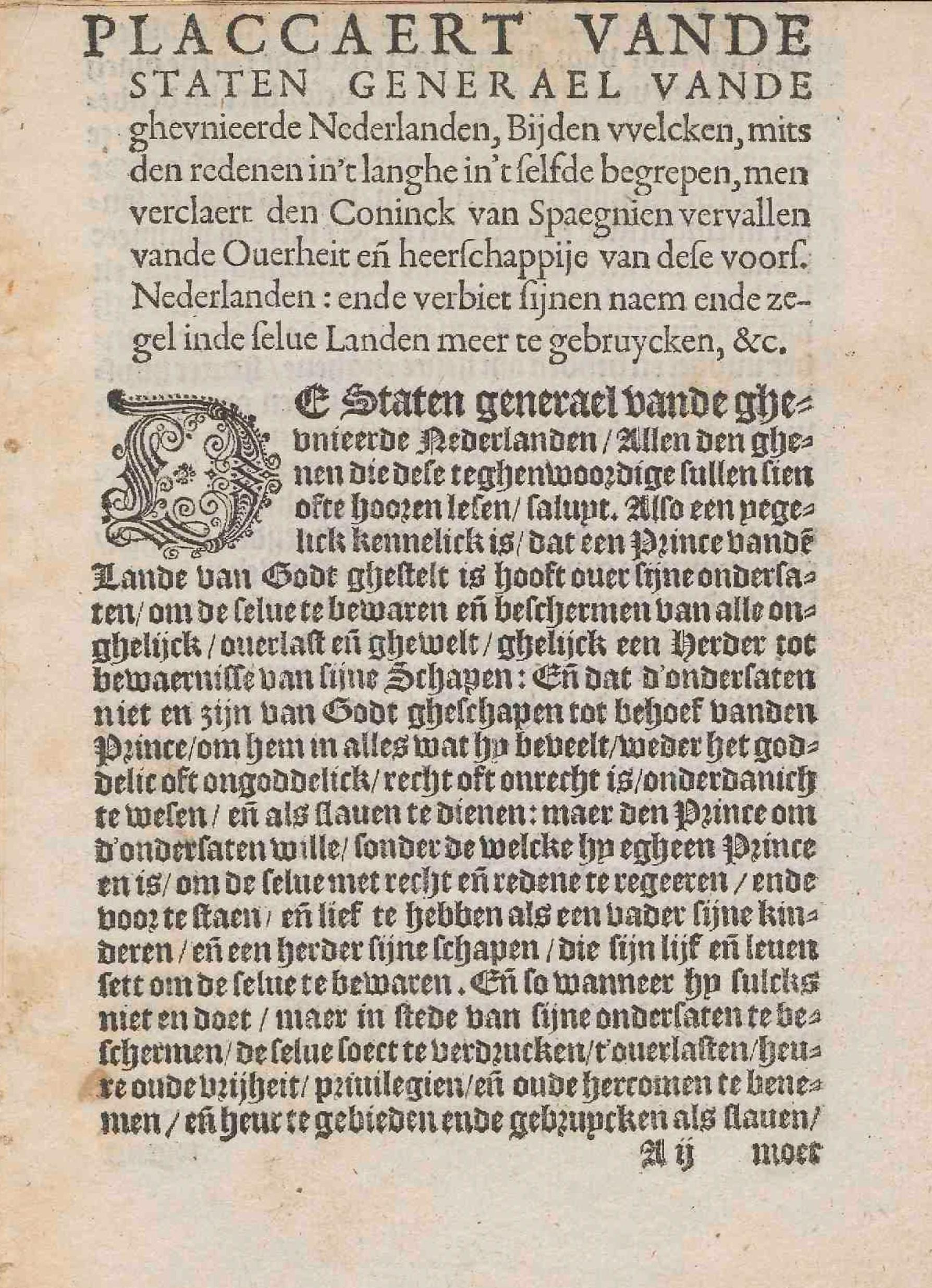
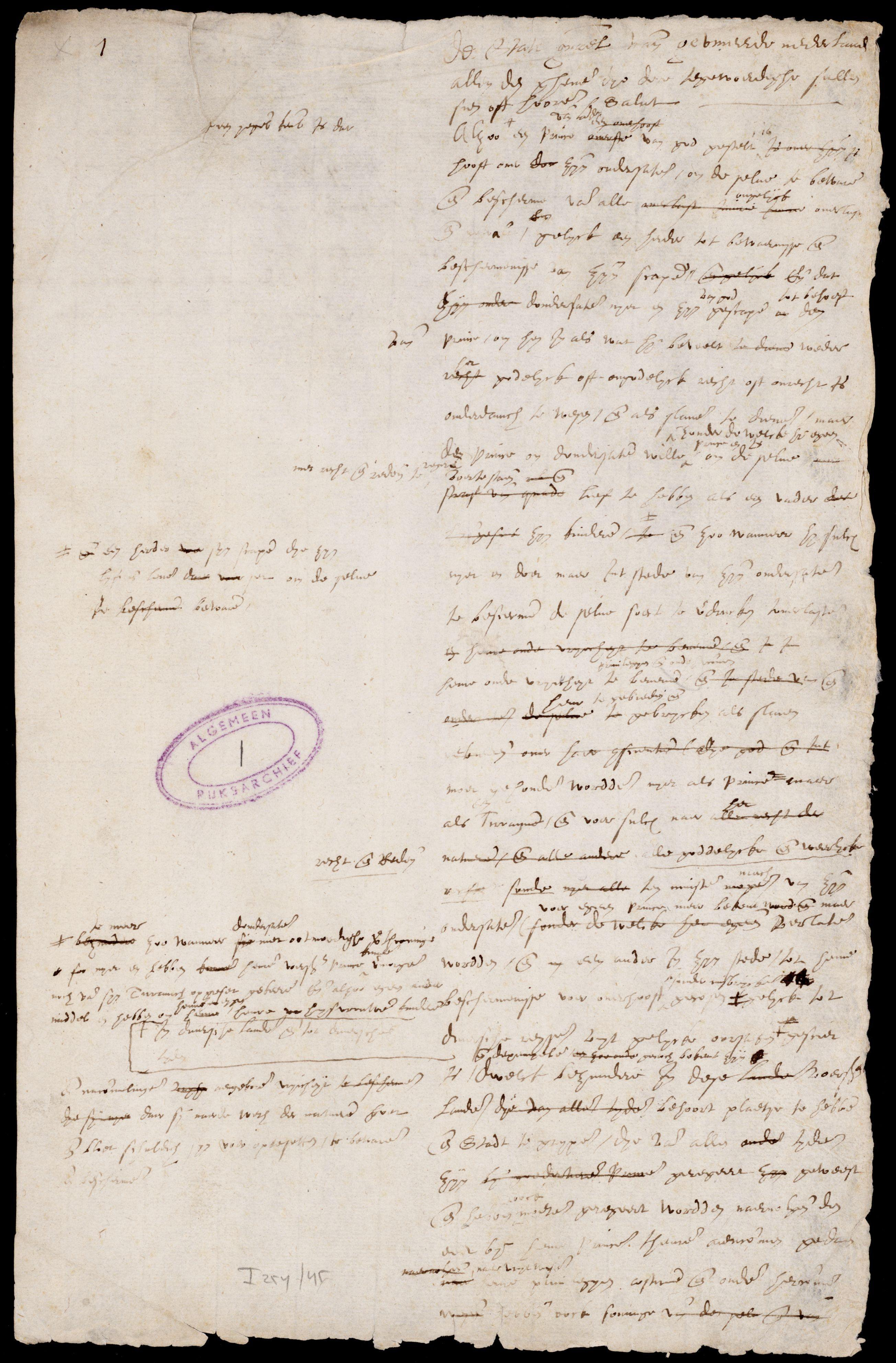
- First page of the printed and written versions of the Act of Abjuration
- Ratified: 26 July 1581
- Author(s): Andries Hessels; Jacques Tayaert; Jacob Valcke; Pieter van Dieven; Jan van Asseliers
- Purpose: Declaration of independence of the Dutch Republic

The Act of Abjuration (Dutch: Plakkaat van Verlatinghe; Spanish: Acta de Abjuración, lit. 'placard of abjuration') is the declaration of independence by many of the provinces of the Netherlands from their allegiance to Philip II of Spain, during the Dutch Revolt.

Signed on 26 July 1581, in The Hague, the Act formally confirmed a decision made by the States General of the Netherlands in Antwerp four days earlier. It declared that all magistrates in the provinces making up the Union of Utrecht were freed from their oaths of allegiance to their lord, Philip, who was also King of Spain. The grounds given were that Philip had failed in his obligations to his subjects, by oppressing them and violating their ancient rights. Philip was therefore considered to have forfeited his thrones as ruler of each of the provinces which signed the Act.

The Act of Abjuration allowed the newly independent territories to govern themselves, although they first offered their thrones to alternative candidates. When this failed, the States of Holland proclaimed their sovereignty by virtue of the Deduction of François Vranck in 1587. Finally, the United Provinces became the Dutch Republic with the instruction of 12 April 1588.

During that period the largest parts of Flanders and Brabant and a small part of Guelders were recaptured by Spain. The partial recapture of these areas from Spain led to the creation of Staats-Vlaanderen, Staats-Brabant, Staats-Overmaas and Staats-Gelre.

The Act of Abjuration is considered a foundational document of modern democracy because it established the radical concept that a sovereign's legitimacy depends on the welfare of their subjects.

== Background ==
The Union of Utrecht

The Seventeen Provinces of the Habsburg Netherlands were united in a personal union by Holy Roman Emperor and King of Spain Charles V with the incorporation of the duchy of Guelders in his Burgundian territories in 1544. It was constituted as a separate entity with his Pragmatic Sanction of 1549.

His son, King Philip II of Spain, inherited these provinces on Charles' abdication in 1555. But this actually meant that he assumed the feudal title of each individual province, as Duke of Brabant, Count of Holland, Count of Flanders etc. There never was a single, unified state of the Netherlands, though the provinces were all represented in the States General of the Netherlands, since the Great Charter or Privilege of Mary of Burgundy, of 10 February 1477.

In the Dutch Revolt, from 1568 several of these provinces rose in rebellion against Philip. Given the monarchical ethos of the time, the revolt had to be justified partly – as William the Silent, the leader of the Dutch Revolt, put it – as an attempt whereby "the Republic’s ancient privileges and liberty should be restored"; partly as directed against the royal councillors, not the king: thus the legal fiction was maintained of just having revolted against his viceroys, successively the Duke of Alba, Luis de Zúñiga y Requesens, John of Austria, and the Duke of Parma, while the stadtholders appointed by the provincial estates continued to claim they represented Philip.

This pretence was already wearing thin, however, by the time of the Pacification of Ghent in 1576. When Don Juan attacked Antwerp and Namur in 1577, the States General – as the provincial estates did with the non-royalist stadtholders – appointed Archduke Matthias, Philip's nephew, as viceroy, without Philip's consent. (Note: There were now two competing viceroys, therefore, whose writ was only recognised in the provinces they controlled.) Matthias was young and inexperienced, and brought no resources of his own to the battle with Philip. This became a serious problem after the Duke of Parma started to make serious inroads against the tenuous unity of the Pacification with his Union of Arras of a number of southern Provinces, which the rebellious northern provinces answered with their own Union of Utrecht, both in 1579. Each union formed its own Estates General. William the Silent therefore decided that the rebellious Netherlands should look for an overlord who could bring useful foreign allies. He hoped that Francis, Duke of Anjou, the younger brother and heir-presumptive of King Henry III of France, who did not wish to be someone else's viceroy, was such a man. The rebel States General was persuaded to offer him the sovereignty of the Netherlands, which he accepted by the Treaty of Plessis-les-Tours, while Matthias was bought off with a generous annuity. Holland and Zeeland however did not join in the offer, preferring to look to William himself for the transfer of sovereignty.

== Act of Abjuration ==
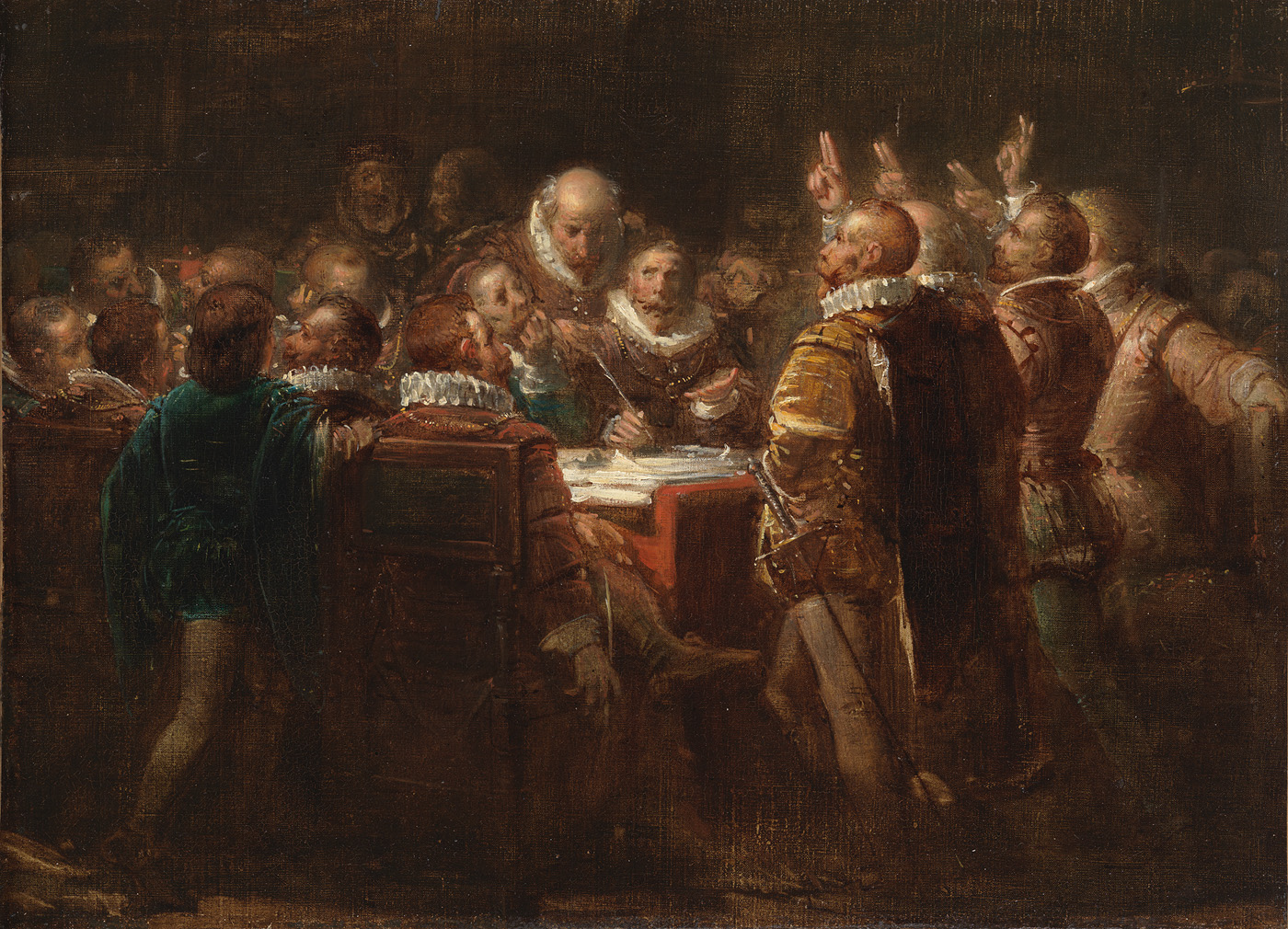
19th-century depiction of the signing of the Act of Abjuration

Transferring the sovereignty of the Netherlands presented a significant problem: the magistrates of the cities and rural areas, and the provincial states themselves, had sworn allegiance to Philip. Oaths of allegiance were taken very seriously during this monarchical era. As long as the conflict with Philip could be glossed over, these magistrates could pretend to remain loyal to the king, but if a new sovereign was recognised, they had to make a choice. The rebellious States General decided on 14 June 1581 to officially declare the throne vacant, because of Philip's behaviour. Hence the Dutch name for the Act of Abjuration: "Plakkaat van Verlatinghe", which may be translated as "Placard of Desertion". (Note: The States General published their Acts by hanging them up in public places as placards. The name for the means of publication became commingled with the name for the Act itself.) This referred not to desertion of Philip by his subjects, but rather, to a suggested desertion of the Dutch "flock" by their malevolent "shepherd," Philip.

A committee of four members – Andries Hessels, greffier (secretary) of the States of Brabant; Jacques Tayaert, pensionary of the city of Ghent; Jacob Valcke, pensionary of the city of Ter Goes (now Goes); and Pieter van Dieven (also known as Petrus Divaeus), pensionary of the city of Mechelen – was charged with drafting what was to become the Act of Abjuration. The Act prohibited the use of the name and seal of Philip in all legal matters, and of his name or arms in minting coins. It gave authority to the Councils of the provinces to henceforth issue the commissions of magistrates. The Act relieved all magistrates of their previous oaths of allegiance to Philip, and prescribed a new oath of allegiance to the States of the province in which they served, according to a form prescribed by the States General. (Note: A close reading of the text of the Act does not show an actual "Oath of Abjuration" as one would expect from the sometimes used English expression for the Act; cf. the text of the Act in any of the external links.) The actual draft seems to have been written by an audiencier (Note: The official who received petitions to the States General and drafted its Placards.) of the States General, Jan van Asseliers.

The Act was remarkable for its extensive preamble, which took the form of an ideological justification, phrased as an indictment (a detailed list of grievances) of King Philip. This form, to which the American Declaration of Independence bears striking resemblance, has given rise to speculation that Thomas Jefferson, when he was writing the latter, was at least partly inspired by the Act of Abjuration.

The preamble was based on Vindiciae contra tyrannos by Philippe de Mornay, and other works of monarchomachs may have been sources of inspiration also. The rebels, in their appeal to public opinion, may have thought it more important to quote "authoritative" sources and refer to "ancient rights" they wished to defend. By deposing a ruler for having violated the social contract with his subjects, they were the first to apply these theoretical ideas. Historian Pieter Geyl described the Act of Abjuration as a "rather splendid, albeit late, expression of the sturdy medieval tradition of liberty," and noted that while the principles expressed in the act were derived from Calvinism, the document lacked a purely religious argument.

In order of appearance, these provinces are mentioned in the declaration: the Duchies of Brabant and Guelders, the Counties of Flanders, Holland and Zeeland, and the Lordships of Frisia, Mechelen and Utrecht. The provinces of Overijssel (which included Drenthe) and Groningen also seceded but are not separately mentioned as they strictly speaking were not separate entities but parts of Utrecht and Guelders, respectively. Large parts of Flanders and Brabant were later occupied again by the Spanish king.

== Aftermath ==
The Act of Abjuration did not solve the problem of authority in the Low Countries. Philip, of course, did not recognise the Act, nor the sovereignty of the Duke of Anjou; while he had already outlawed William of Orange and put a price on his head. Many magistrates refused to take the new oath and preferred to resign from their offices, thus changing the political makeup of many rebellious cities in the Netherlands, strengthening the radicals. At the same time, the States-General had their own claim for authority, as indeed did William as their representative in most provinces, while Anjou was left as a sort of empty figure-head. The latter was not satisfied with his limited powers and made an attempt to subjugate a number of cities, including Antwerp. His assault on the latter, known as the French Fury, led to a humiliating repulse and greatly discredited the Duke.

This caused the States General to start looking for a different sovereign. After a first attempt to interest Elizabeth I of England in assuming sovereignty did not succeed, William the Silent was asked to assume the "vacant" title of Count of Holland, but he was assassinated in 1584, before the arrangements could be finalised. After the Treaty of Nonsuch Elizabeth agreed to send aid to the Dutch rebels as their protector, though without assuming sovereignty. Under the provisions of the treaty, Robert Dudley, 1st Earl of Leicester was appointed Governor-General of the Netherlands. However, like the "reign" of the Duke of Anjou, this proved to be a disappointment. After Leicester's departure in 1587, and given what the British historian John Huxtable Elliott called "the slow decline of the monarchical idea, in the face of repeated failures", the States General decided to assume sovereignty themselves, thereby making the seven (Note: By this time the reconquest of the Southern Netherlands by the Duke of Parma had removed Flanders, Mechelen, and Brabant as members of the northern Union.) United Provinces a republic.

== See also ==
- Thirty Years' War
  - Peace of Westphalia
- Eighty Years' War
  - Peace of Münster

== Notes and references ==
=== Sources ===
- Gachard, L.P. (1890), Études et notices historiques concernant l'histoire des Pays-Bas
