= Guelders Wars =

Series of conflicts in the Low Countries

- Part of the Hook and Cod wars
Date	1502–1543
Location	Low Countries
Result	Burgundian victory
Territorial changes	The Duchy of Guelders is incorporated into the Seventeen Provinces

Belligerents
Habsburg Netherlands	Duchy of Guelders

Commanders and leaders
House of Habsburg	Charles, Duke of Guelders

Casualties and losses
Unknown	Unknown

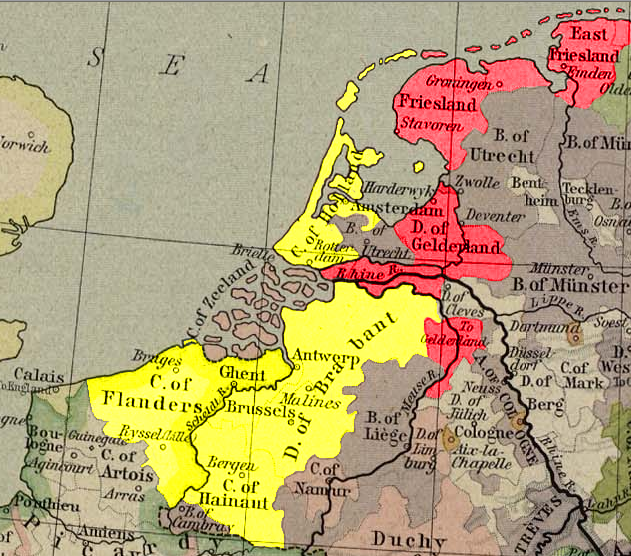
Yellow: Holland, Flanders, Brabant, and Hainaut. Red: Guelders, Groningen, and Frisia.

The Guelders Wars (Dutch: Gelderse oorlogen, German: Geldrische Erbfolgekriege) were a series of conflicts in the Low Countries between the Duke of Burgundy, who controlled Holland, Flanders, Brabant, and Hainaut on the one side, and Charles, Duke of Guelders, who controlled Guelders, Groningen, and Frisia on the other side.

The wars lasted from 1502 to 1543 and ended with a Burgundian victory. With this outcome, all of the Low Countries were now under the control of Charles V, Holy Roman Emperor. The conflicts were characterised by the absence of large battles between the armies of both parties. Instead small hit and run actions, raids, and ambushes were common practices. Regardless, the impact on civilians was large with hostilities and incidents occurring throughout the Low Countries.

The wars included the sack of The Hague in 1528 and the failed siege of Antwerp in 1542 under the command of the Guelderian field marshal Maarten van Rossum. The war ended with the total destruction and death of nearly all inhabitants of the town of Düren after which the other Gueldrian towns surrendered to Habsburg rule by the Treaty of Venlo.

The latter portion of the wars intersected with the larger conflict between France and Spain known as the Italian Wars.

== Background ==
The origins of the Guelders Wars is traced back to 1471, when Charles the Bold lent 300,000 gold guilders to Arnold, Duke of Guelders. As a "bail", in order to protect himself in case he would not be repaid, Charles chose the title of the Duchy of Guelders. Arnold did not pay the sum back, and thus, when he died in 1473, Charles the Bold assumed the title to the duchy. Arnold's son Adolf and subsequently grandson Charles, decided to take back the duchy by military means.

== 1502–1514 ==
Between 1502 and 1515, the Habsburgs tried without success to reconquer the Duchy of Guelders, which had belonged to the House of Burgundy between 1473 and 1492. On the other hand, Charles, Duke of Guelders, tried to conquer Overijssel which belonged to the Bishopric of Utrecht, also without success.

== 1514-1517 ==
In this period, the Saxon feud was fought, in which George, Duke of Saxony, allied with the Habsburgs, tried to subdue Frisia, the Ommelanden, and Groningen. The Frisians under the leadership of Jancko Douwama resisted and were supported by Edzard I, Count of East Frisia, and the inimitable Charles, Duke of Guelders. George of Saxony failed to conquer Groningen and was pushed back. When he held only a handful of cities (Leeuwarden, Harlingen en Franeker), he sold his rights to Charles of Habsburg in May 1515.

In the meantime, the Frisian rebels, led by the legendary Pier Gerlofs Donia and Wijerd Jelckama, won many battles at sea and raided through Holland at the head of the Arumer Zwarte Hoop. Because Charles of Habsburg needed to consolidate the Spanish throne and manoeuver to become Holy Roman Emperor in Germany, he concluded peace with Edzard I, recognizing him as Count of East-Frisia and with Charles, Duke of Guelders, leaving him in control of most of Frisia, the Ommelanden, and Groningen. Charles of Guelders consequently conquered Overijssel in 1521–1522, with the support of Zwolle.

== 1522–1528 ==
In 1522, the Habsburg force under Georg Schenck van Toutenburg resumed the offensive and pushed the Guelders forces the following year out of Frisia. Furthermore, the Frisians rebels, whose charismatic leader Pier Gerlofs Donia had died from illness in 1520, were also defeated. Their leader Wijerd Jelckama and what was left of the Frisian army were captured in 1523, taken to the city of Leeuwarden and publicly beheaded. Jancko Douwama was also taken prisoner and died in captivity in Vilvoorde. By December 1524, Frisia was firmly in the hands of the Habsburg. It was renamed into the Lordship of Frisia and ruled by a Stadtholder.

Henry of the Palatinate, the new Prince-Bishop of Utrecht, was in conflict with his own Utrecht citizens, who invited troops from Guelders to occupy the city. Henry had no choice but to ask Charles of Habsburg for help. The States of Overijssel also asked Charles to liberate their lands from Guelders. Charles of Habsburg demanded a price, namely that they recognized him as Lord, to which they agreed.

Schenck van Toutenburg moved his army into Overijssel and Utrecht and easily chased the Guelders troops, who had already become very unpopular amongst the population. On 21 October 1528 Bishop Henry handed over power to Charles of Habsburg. The Bishopric of Utrecht came to an end and was divided into the Lordship of Utrecht and the Lordship of Overijssel, both ruled by a Habsburg Stadtholder.

A daring raid through Holland, culminating in the sack of The Hague by Maarten van Rossum, Field Marshal of Guelders, didn't prevent Schenk van Toutenburg to attack some cities in Guelders, after which Charles of Guelders agreed to sign the Treaty of Gorinchem on 3 October 1528.

== 1534–1536 ==
In 1534, the Danish Count's Feud spilled over into the Low Countries when Habsburg supported Enno II, Count of East Frisia, ally of Christopher of Oldenburg and Charles, Duke of Guelders, supported Balthasar Oomkens von Esens, ally of Christian III of Denmark.

In May 1536, Meindert van Ham, supported by Denmark and Guelders, invaded Groningen and threatened Holland. As a reaction, Holland gathered a fleet to lift the siege of Copenhagen, and Habsburg sent Schenck van Toutenburg to chase the enemy troops from Groningen.

Schenck van Toutenburg was allowed to occupy the City of Groningen and defeated Meindert van Ham in the Battle of Heiligerlee (1536). Before the Dutch fleet was ready to sail, Copenhagen fell in the hands of Christian III of Denmark, and peace was concluded.
Habsburg became master of Groningen and Drenthe, which was renamed Lordship of Groningen and County of Drenthe. Charles of Guelders was forced to sign the Treaty of Grave.

== 1538–1543 ==
When Charles of Guelders died without an heir on 30 June 1538, he had done everything he could to find a successor other than Emperor Charles V. He had appointed William, Duke of Jülich-Cleves-Berg, related through his great-grandfather Reinald IV, Duke of Guelders and Jülich (1365–1423), as his successor. William allied himself with the King of France and married Jeanne d'Albret. When the Low Countries were at war with France, he sent in 1542 Maarten van Rossum on a raid through Brabant, plundering the countryside and besieging Antwerp and Leuven. These attacks were countered by Mary of Hungary (governor of the Netherlands) and Louis of Praet.
As a reaction, Mary of Hungary sent an army toward Guelders and Jülich, which were conquered in 1543, after two failed earlier attempts. In the Treaty of Venlo, William of Jülich was forced to cede the Duchy of Guelders and the County of Zutphen to Charles V, but was allowed to keep Jülich.

This treaty concluded the formation of the Seventeen Provinces.

== Maps ==
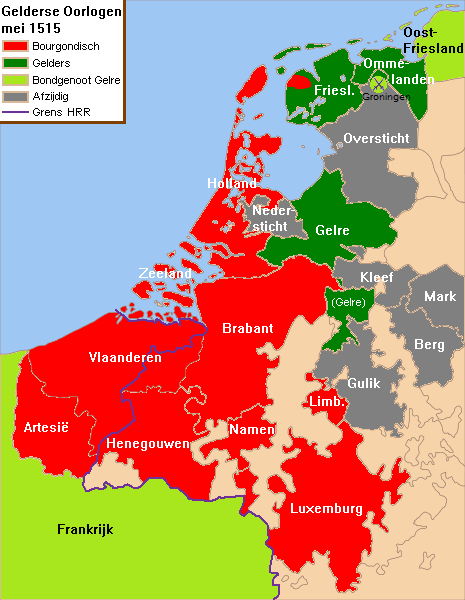
May 1515

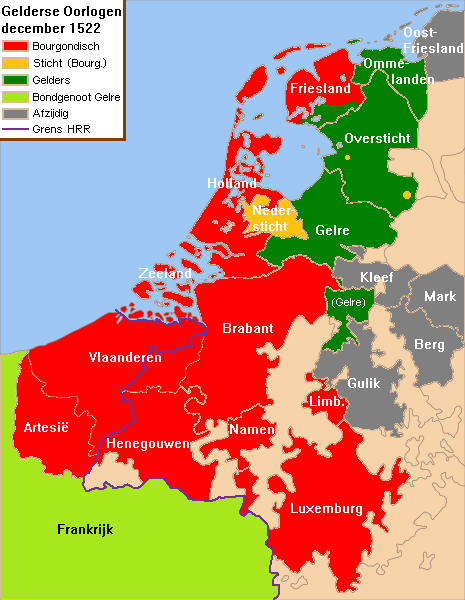
December 1522

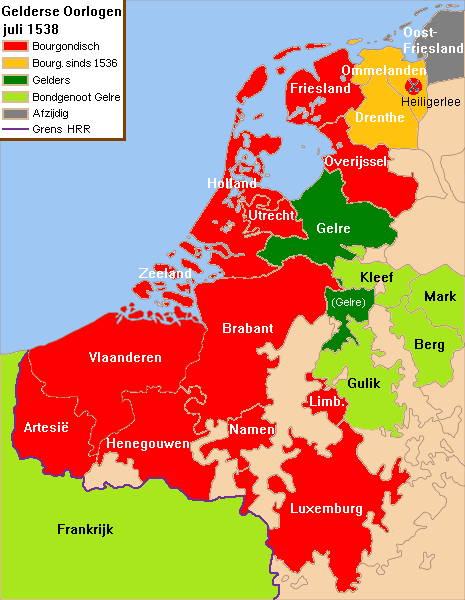
July 1538

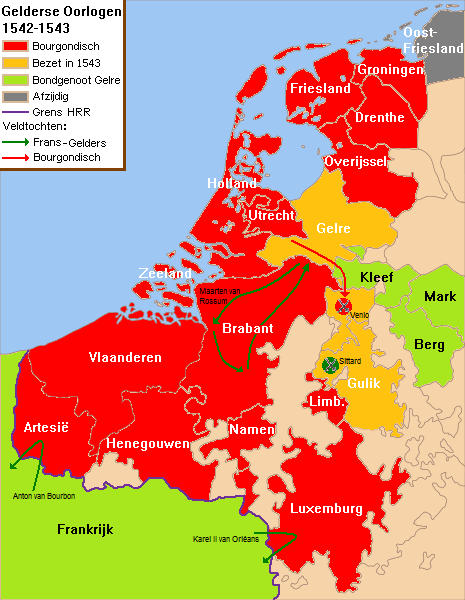
1542-1543
