= Treaty of Venlo =

1543 treaty ending the Guelders Wars

Duchy of Guelders and County of Zutphen around 1350

The Treaty of Venlo of 7 September 1543 concluded the Guelders Wars (1502–1543), and the definitive acquisition of the Duchy of Guelders and the adjoining County of Zutphen by the House of Habsburg, adding them to the Habsburg Netherlands. William V, Duke of the United Duchies of Jülich-Cleves-Berg had to relinquish his claims to Guelders and Zutphen in favour of the Holy Roman Emperor and King of Spain, Charles V of Habsburg.

== Background ==
The Guelders Wars broke out in 1502 over an old, unsettled dispute. At the end of the Second War of the Guelderian Succession (1423–1448), Gerhard VII, Duke of Jülich-Berg sold his claims to the Duchy of Guelders to Philip the Good, Duke of Burgundy. In subsequent years, a long-lastig succession dispute broke out within the Guelders-ruling House of Egmont between Arnold, Duke of Guelders (died 1473) and his son Adolf, Duke of Guelders, which Philip's son Charles the Bold exploited to seize Guelders in 1473. After he died in 1477, the War of the Burgundian Succession broke out, during which his daughter Mary married Maximilian of Austria; thus all Burgundian possessions were acquired by the Habsburgs. However, States of Guelders exploited the confusion to declare independence and proclaim Charles II, son of Adolf, as the new Guelderian duke, with his aunt Catherine as regent. This Guelderian War of Independence (1477–1499) ended in a Habsburg defeat, and Charles II firmly established his reign with the support of Kingdom of France.

In 1502, Maximilian's son Philip the Handsome renewed the war with Charles II in order to recover Guelders, but Charles boldly waged war to defend and expand Guelderian power across the eastern and northern Netherlands during the next 36 years. Intermittently seizing control of Oversticht (modern Overijssel and Drenthe) and Nedersticht (modern Utrecht province) of the Prince-Bishopric of Utrecht, the city of Groningen and its Ommelanden and most of Frisia (modern Friesland), and carrying out raids across Holland and Brabant, Charles II came close to establishing an independent kingdom. When Philip's son Charles V became Holy Roman Emperor in 1519, this decidedly shifted the balance of power in Habsburg's favour; he only had to properly manage his personnel, troops, and resources, but that proved to be difficult as he had to manage all of Europe and the Spanish colonies. In 1538, Charles II died without an heir, and the States of Guelders elected William, Duke of Jülich-Cleves-Berg to succeed him. William V eventually had to sue for peace in 1543, when all of Guelders, Zutphen and Jülich were occupied by Habsburg troops and France failed to come to his aid. The Treaty of Venlo forced him to relinquish Guelders and Zutphen to Charles V, and he had to commit himself to suppressing the rise of Protestantism in his remaining lands of Jülich, Cleves, Berg, Mark and Ravenstein, keeping his population Catholic.

== Literature ==
- F. Keverling Buisman, Verdrag en Tractaat van Venlo (1993). Hilversum: Uitgeverij Verloren.
