= Battle of Heiligerlee =

The Battle of Heiligerlee may refer to:

- Battle of Heiligerlee (1536), a battle fought between the Danish allies of Charles of Guelders and Habsburg forces during the Guelderian Wars
- Battle of Heiligerlee (1568), a battle fought between Dutch rebels and the Spanish army of Friesland, the first Dutch victory during the Eighty Years' War
