= Meindert van Ham =

German mercenary commander (c. 1470 – after 1545)

Meindert van Ham (Meinhard von Hamm, or Meinert van (den) Hamm(e)) (c. 1470 – after 1545) was an army commander from Hamm in Westphalia.

He commanded an army of Landsknechts and offered his services to several rulers. He fought for Balthasar Oomkens von Esens, Christian III of Denmark, George, Duke of Saxony and Charles of Guelders. He was a contemporary of Maarten van Rossum and served several years as his right hand.

In 1536, during the Guelders Wars, Meindert van Ham occupied and terrorized the Ommelanden with 3,000 men, until he was defeated in the Battle of Heiligerlee (1536) by Georg Schenck van Toutenburg and Philip de Lalaing. He was captured and was held prisoner at Vilvoorde for a long time. What became of him after his release is unknown.

He also composed some poems and songs.
