= Klaarkamp Abbey =

Coordinates: 53°18′43″N 5°56′22″E

Klaarkamp Abbey (Dutch: Klooster Klaarkamp; Latin: Monasterium beatae Mariae de Claro Campo) was a Cistercian monastery in the community of Dantumadeel, about 4 kilometres southwest of Dokkum and 2 kilometres north of Rinsumageast in the Dutch province of Friesland.

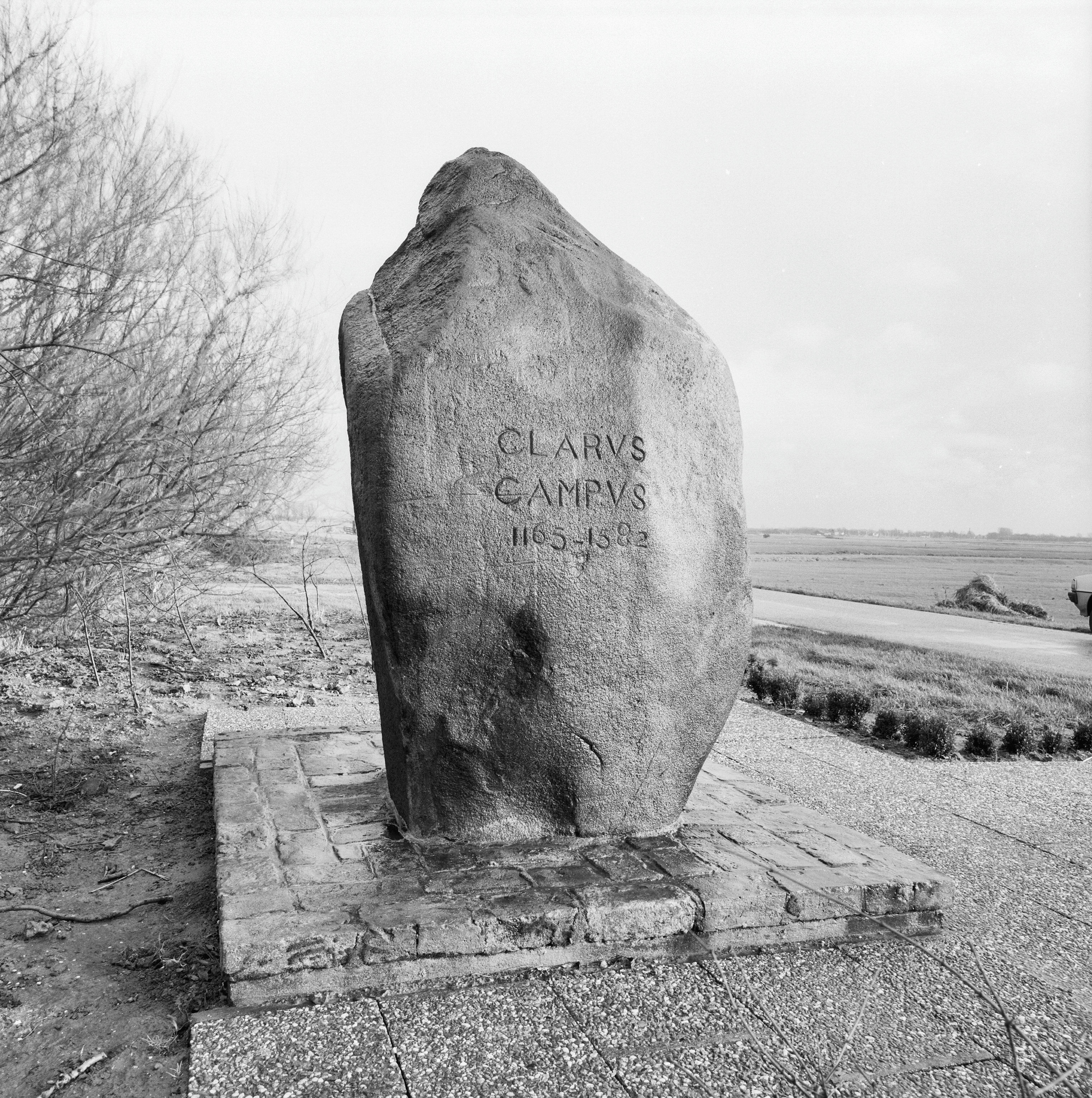
Stele as a remembrance of the abbey.

== History ==
The abbey was founded in either 1163 or 1165, either directly from Clairvaux Abbey in France, which is the more generally accepted account, or from Riddagshausen Abbey near Braunschweig, in which case Klaarkamp was of the filiation of Morimond. The abbey's daughter houses were Bloemkamp Abbey (founded c. 1190 near Bolsward), Aduard Abbey (founded 1192) and Gerka Abbey (founded 1240 in Gerkesklooster near Buitenpost). The monastery was engaged in brick production from the clay on its land, and employed hundreds of lay brothers in this work.

The abbey's main estates were in Jannum, Sibrandahûs, Feanwâlden and on the island of Schiermonnikoog. It also owned a grange at Betterwird, apparently in Westdongeradeel.

During the Reformation battles of the Eighty Years' War Friesland converted to Protestantism and secularised all its religious houses. On 31 May 1580 the abbey was dissolved and its assets confiscated by the state of Friesland. The buildings were sold off and demolished. In the 19th and early 20th centuries the mound, about 4 metres high, on which the monastery had stood was removed, and some excavation took place at that time.

== Premises and buildings ==
Nothing remains of the abbey buildings. The site is marked by a monolith.

== Sources and external links ==
- Website about Klaarkamp Abbey (in Dutch)
- Photo of reconstruction of abbey
