= Jancko Douwama =

Frisian nobleman

Jancko Douwama was a Frisian nobleman who fought to free Friesland from foreign rule during the Vetkopers and Schieringers conflict, the Saxon feud and the Guelders Wars.

== Biography ==
He was born around 1482 into a Vetkoper 'hoofdelingen' or 'untitled noble' family near Oldeboorn/Aldeboarn, Friesland. He was the son of the chieftain Douwe Douwama and his wife Riem Eesckes. Jancko was married to Teth Luersma.

Jancko Douwama lived in much troubled times during the final stages of a civil war in Friesland between the monastical factions called the Vetkopers and Schieringers. The Schieringers employed the assistance of the Saxon ruler Albert in 1498 gaining the upper hand over the Vetkopers. Douwama, a supporter of the Vetkopers, then began his fight against the Saxon overlord. He did this firstly from Groningen, where his wife came from and where he also had lived. In 1502 he returned to Friesland and recognised duke Albert in 1504 as its lord. In 1512, he went to the Duchy of Guelders and became employed by Charles II, Duke of Guelders. Charles had long held plans to conquer Friesland.

In 1514, Douwama was leader of Charles' Guelderian army that invaded Friesland. In 1517, disagreements between the Duke of Guelders and Jancko concerning the planning of the governing board of Friesland, and Guelders refusing to recognise Douwama as hereditary-lord eventually led to Jancko changing allegiances. In 1521 Jancko swore an oath of allegiance to the Holy Roman Emperor Charles V of Habsburg, the arch-enemy of the Duke of Guelders. The Frisians chose Jancko Douwama as their imperial stadtholder in 1522. The emperor Charles V, however, suspected that Jancko was an infiltrator for the Guelderians, and in 1523 Jancko was imprisoned in the castle of Vilvoorde in modern Belgium, where he died in 1533.

== Legacy ==
His names and actions are mentioned by the monk/historian Petrus Thaborita.

Whilst imprisoned in the castle of Vilvoorde, Jancko wrote his memoirs, titled the 'Boeck der Partijen' (Book of the Parties) which is considered one of the oldest written autobiographies. This historical essay discusses the origins of the discord between the warring parties in Friesland and of the activities of the author followed by a refutation of the charge of treason against the author. The memoirs gives Jancko's definition of the terms Schieringers and Vetkopers; 'Vetkopers' (fatbuyers) were so called because they had much and could buy fat products. The poor adopted the name 'Schieringers' because they preferred negotiations over violence. In Frisian, schieren means the same as 'to speak', schiering means 'tale' and schieringen means 'many beautiful words'.

Jancko Douwama is considered a hero of Frisian nationalism.

== Literature ==
- Kist, Martha; Wind, Harmen (2003). Een man van eer. Bloemlezing uit 'Jancko Douwama's Geschriften' [A Man of Honour. Anthology from 'Jancko Douwama's Writings']. Hilversum: Uitgeverij Verloren. p. 238. ISBN 9065507698. Archived from the original on 2020-09-29.

== External sources ==
- The writing of Jancko Douwama(in Dutch)
- Writings on Jancko Douwama(in Dutch)
- The Doumaleen(in Dutch)
