= Treaty of Grave =

The Peace of Grave was signed on December 10, 1536, during the Guelders Wars between Charles II, Duke of Guelders and Charles V, Holy Roman Emperor.

In the treaty, Charles of Guelders handed over the City of Groningen, the Ommelanden and Drenthe to Emperor Charles. This was a confirmation of the actual situation in which Schenk van Toutenburg, Habsburg Stadtholder of Frisia, had conquered these land after defeating Charles of Guelders and his allies in the Battle of Heiligerlee (1536).

== Sources ==
- Israel, J.I.,The Dutch Republic; Its rise, greatness, and fall 1477-1806 (Oxford 1998), 63–64.
