= Bloemkamp Abbey =

Coordinates: 53°04′28″N 5°34′48″E

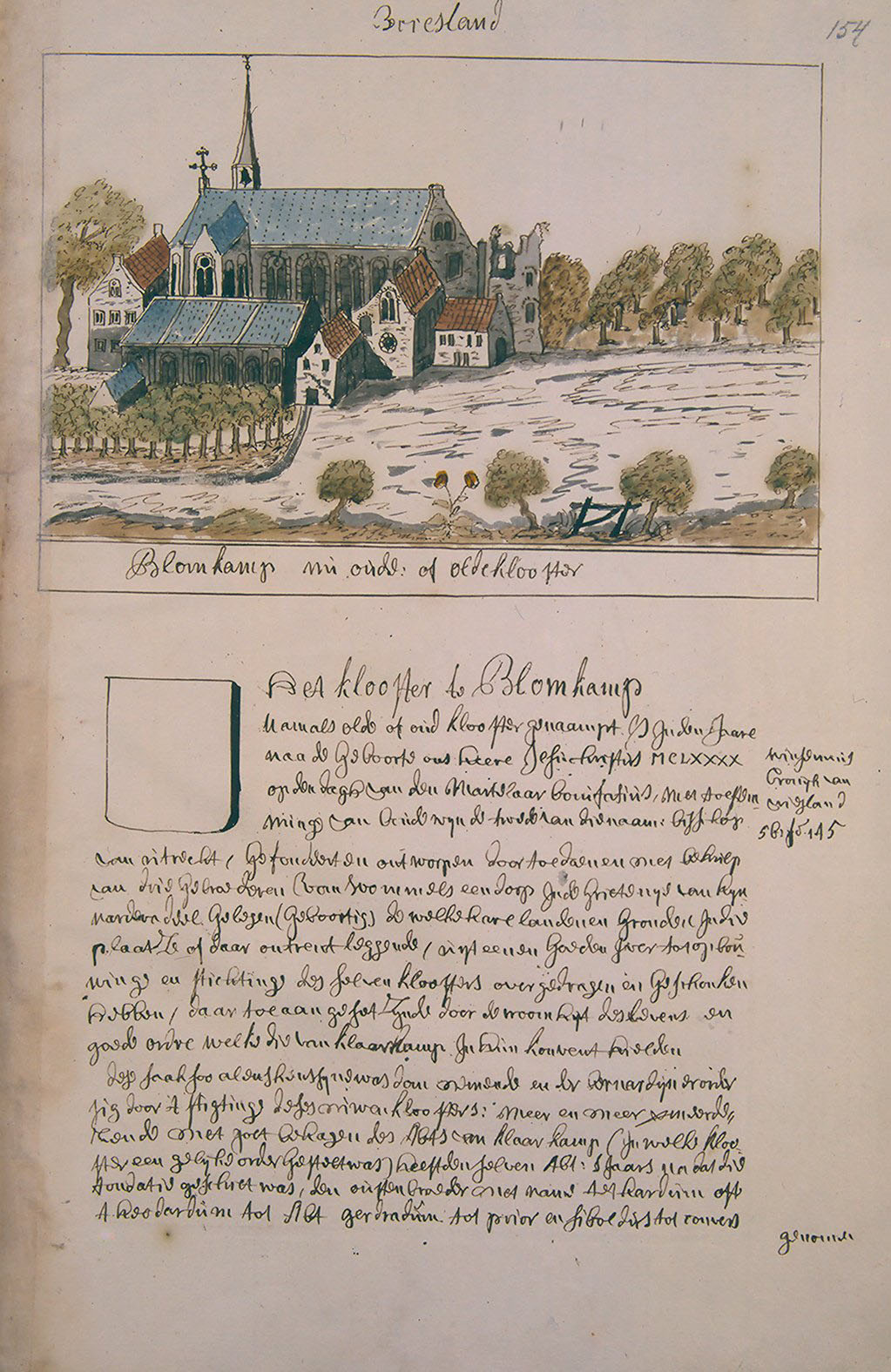
Bloemkamp Abbey, from the Atlas Schoemaker, 1710-35

Bloemkamp Abbey (Dutch: Abdij Bloemkamp, also Oldeklooster; Latin: Floridus campus) is a former Cistercian abbey in the Netherlands, located in Hartwerd in the municipality of Wûnseradiel to the north-east of Bolsward, in the province of Friesland.

== History ==
The abbey was founded in approximately 1190-1192 by the brothers Tethard, Herdrad and Sybold, and settled from Klaarkamp Abbey, of the filiation of Clairvaux. It was dedicated by Balduin of Holland, bishop of Utrecht. Tethard was the first abbot and Herdrad the first prior. The second abbot was Wighard.

The abbey acquired rights of patronage over the church of Scharnegoutum, and newly reclaimed land on the Middelzee.

In the conflict between the Schieringer and the Vetkooper, the abbey took the side of the Schieringer. In 1347, under the bellicose twelfth abbot, Meikulpus, the monks of Bloemkamp unsuccessfully attacked Pingjum Abbey. Renicus Camga, who became abbot in 1377, was also warlike, and maintained hostilities with the monks of Ludingakerk Abbey, who supported the party of the Vetkooper. Battles with the monks of Ludingakerk in 1380 and 1420, as well as with the burghers of Bolsward, led to the decline of the abbey, made worse by the great flood of 1464, which caused serious damage to its estates.

Nevertheless, it recovered within a few years, and was able to build a library, an infirmary and summer quarters for the monks, and its reputation and status were later restored to the extent that in 1499 Abbot Petrus Poppingawier was appointed a member of the High Council of Frisia.

In 1515 the abbey was besieged by the peasant army of the Arumer Zwarte Hoop, until they were driven off by the troops of Lenard Swartsenburg.

In 1535 the abbey was overrun by the Anabaptists, who were however quickly defeated and executed by the troops of Georg Schenck, Stadtholder of Frisia.

In 1572 the abbey was laid waste by Protestants but continued as a community until 1579. In this year the abbot was imprisoned and Protestantism introduced throughout Frisia. The state confiscated the abbey's goods, and the estates were later sold off.

=== Burials ===
In 1345 Count William IV of Holland was buried in the abbey church.

== Site and buildings ==
There are no visible remains of the abbey buildings, but the place name Oldeclooster is still in use.

== See also ==
- Friso-Hollandic Wars

== Bibliography ==
- Bouwstra, H., 2008: Bloemkamp: geschiedenis van het Cisterciënzer klooster Bloemkamp, 1191-1580
