= Aduard Abbey =

- Abdij van Aduard; Abdij Sint-Bernardus in Aduard
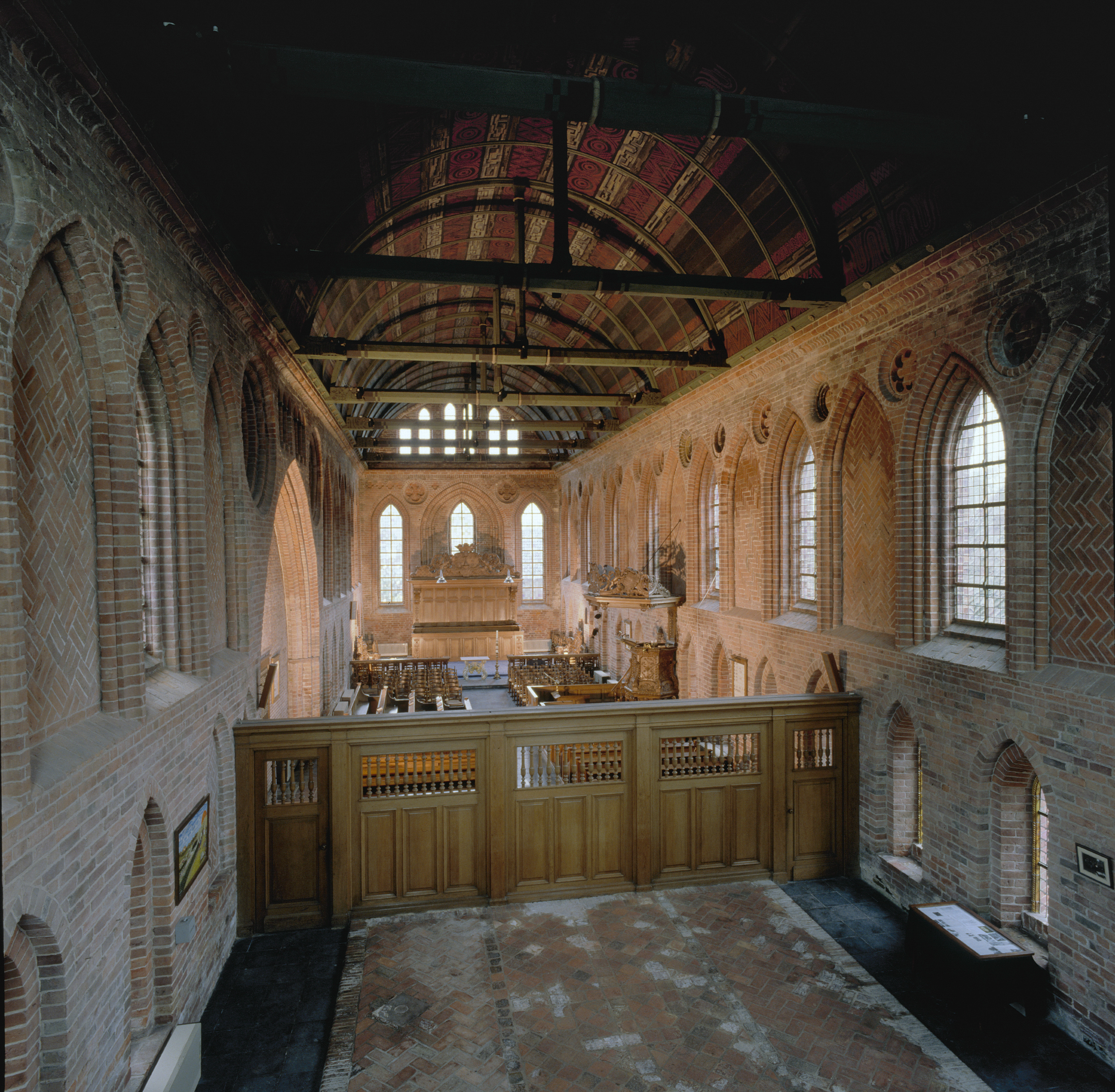
- Former refectory, now used as a church

- Location within Netherlands

General information
- Location: Netherlands
- Coordinates: 53°15′22.65″N 6°27′32.38″E

Aduard Abbey (Dutch: Abdij van Aduard, Abdij Sint-Bernardus in Aduard) is a former Cistercian abbey in the village of Aduard about 8 kilometres to the north-west of Groningen in the Netherlands, founded in 1192 and dissolved in 1580.

== History ==
The monastery was founded in 1192 at Klaarkamp Abbey near Dokkum (of the filiation of Clairvaux). Aduard Abbey in its turn founded Ihlow Abbey in East Frisia in 1231. In 1259 Aduard took over Termunten Abbey, at that time still in Menterna, previously a Benedictine double monastery (the nuns were dispatched to a separate establishment, the short-lived Midwolde Abbey).

Aduard Abbey was considered one of the richest, largest and best-known monasteries in the northern Low Countries. From 1245, it had an abbey school. At the end of the 14th century discipline relaxed for a time, but was re-established. In the abbey's heyday under Abbot Henricus van Rees, in the second half of the 15th century, some 300 monks lived there and played a significant part in the reclamation and cultivation of the land.

The abbey perished in the wars that accompanied the Reformation. In 1580, the buildings, including the priceless library and the monastery archives, were destroyed by fire after an attack by the Geuzes. The monks fled to their town house in Groningen. Most of the abandoned abbey buildings were soon demolished and the resulting rubble used as building stone for the inhabitants of the surrounding countryside. The abbey is believed to have been formally dissolved in 1594. The last abbot died in 1613.

The former abbey precinct is identical to the centre of the present village of Aduard.

== Site and buildings ==
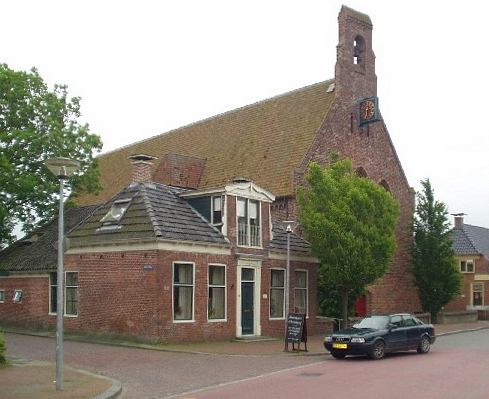
Former infirmary or refectory

The first abbey church, probably built immediately after the foundation, was replaced between 1240 and 1263 by a second, enlarged church. This building, as Ubbo Emmius reports in detail and as was confirmed by excavations from 1939 to 1941, was about 83 metres long and the transept was about 40 metres wide. The nave had three aisles and five bays. The transept had two rectangular chapels to the east of each wing. The choir had an ambulatory and seven semi-circular choir chapels, on the model of Clairvaux Abbey. To the south of the church lay the courtyard and the cloister.

The infirmary (or refectory) still survives and was restored between 1917 and 1928. It is a large long hall building two storeys in height, made out of brick, with pointed-arch windows and blind windows, and a wooden barrel vault roof, dating from around 1300. The building is now used as a Reformed church.

=== Letter bricks ===
Part of the original floor of glazed bricks has survived, including some early 14th-century plaster bricks, each stamped with a letter of the alphabet, which can be moved around to make whole texts. Such mediaeval lettered bricks may be seen as an early form of moveable type.

== Aduarder Kring ==
The high point of the abbey school was in the mid-15th century, when the abbey was able to attract scholars from across Northern Europe, including Wessel Gansfort, Rudolf Agricola and Alexander Hegius. They came to debate in the abbey's little academy, the Aduarder kring ("Aduard circle"). The most informative source on this is the 1528 letter from Goswinus van Halen to his former pupil Albertus Risaeus, in which he gives a summary of the main members of the Aduarder Kring, in total 23 names, and adds that there were more. After the death of Hendrik van Rees the emphasis on studies was slightly reduced, but discussions and presentations also took place under later abbots. Albertus Risaeus presented his enlightened ideas here, for which scholars such as Philipp Melanchthon praised the school and its students.
