= Battle of Heiligerlee (1536) =

1536 battle during the Guelderian Wars

- Part of Guelders Wars and the Count's Feud
Date	5 August 1536
Location	Heiligerlee, Ommelanden, Low Countries
Result	Habsburg victory
Territorial changes	Groningen, Ommelanden, and Drenthe annexed by Habsburg

Belligerents
Habsburg Netherlands	Duchy of Guelders

Commanders and leaders
Georg Schenck van Toutenburg	Meindert van Ham

Strength
4,500	3,000

The Battle of Heiligerlee (5 August 1536) was a battle during the Guelders Wars, in which the Danish allies of Charles of Guelders, under command of Meindert van Ham, were defeated by Habsburg forces under Georg Schenck van Toutenburg.

In 1534, the Danish Count's Feud spilled over into the Low Countries where the Guelders Wars were raging, when Habsburg supported Enno II, Count of East Frisia, ally of Christopher of Oldenburg and Charles, Duke of Guelders, supported Balthasar Oomkens von Esens, ally of Christian III of Denmark.

In May 1536, Meindert van Ham, supported by Denmark and Guelders, invaded Groningen. He threatened to invade Holland if the Habsburg Netherlands would gather a fleet in support of Christopher of Oldenburg to lift the siege of Copenhagen. Mary of Hungary nevertheless ordered Adolf of Burgundy to compose a fleet of 45 Dutch, Spanish, and Portuguese ships with 3,000 sailors and 4,500 troops under command of Frederick II, Elector Palatine. She also sent Georg Schenck van Toutenburg with the soldiers to Groningen to eliminate the threat of the enemy troops there.

Schenck van Toutenburg was allowed by the citizens to occupy the City of Groningen and continued towards Appingedam. The two armies did battle near Heiligerlee and Meindert van Ham was defeated.

== Consequences ==
Before the Dutch fleet was ready to sail, Copenhagen fell in the hands of Christian III of Denmark, and peace was concluded in the Count's Feud.
Habsburg became master of Groningen and Drenthe, which were renamed Lordship of Groningen and County of Drenthe. Charles of Guelders was forced to sign the Treaty of Grave.

== Sources ==
- Israel, J.I.,The Dutch Republic; Its rise, greatness, and fall 1477-1806 (Oxford 1998), 63-64.
