= Seventeen Provinces =

Union of states in the 16th-century Low Countries

Seventeen Provinces Zeventien Provinciën (Dutch) Dix-Sept Provinces (French) Diecisiete Provincias (Spanish)
- 1549–1581
- Cross of Burgundy Coat of arms

- Map of the Netherlands in 1555, with the Seventeen Provinces highlighted in color. States which may be geographically considered part of the Netherlands, but which were not part of the Habsburg Netherlands shown in light grey.
- Status: Personal union of Imperial fiefs
- Capital: Brussels
- Common languages: Dutch; Low Saxon; Frisian; Walloon; Luxembourgish; French
- Religion: Catholic (official); Protestant
- Government: Monarchy
- Historical era: Early modern period
  - Pragmatic Sanction of 1549: 1549
  - Dutch Act of Abjuration: 1581
- ISO 3166 code: NL
Preceded by	Succeeded by
Habsburg Netherlands	Dutch Republic; Spanish Netherlands

The Seventeen Provinces (Dutch: Zeventien Provinciën, French: Dix-Sept Provinces, Spanish: Diecisiete Provincias) was a term used to describe the Spanish Netherlands before the Dutch Revolt, when they were at their largest extent. They covered most of the Low Countries, i.e., what is now the Netherlands, Belgium, Luxembourg, and most of the French departments of Nord (French Flanders and French Hainaut) and Pas-de-Calais (Artois).

The Seventeen Provinces arose from the Burgundian Netherlands, a number of fiefs held by the House of Valois-Burgundy and inherited by the House of Habsburg in 1482, and held by Habsburg Spain from 1556. Starting in 1512, the Provinces formed the major part of the Burgundian Circle. In 1581, many of these provinces seceded to form what would eventually become the Dutch Republic.

== Definition and composition ==
As the term "province" did not denote a specific administrative unit, but rather was a term of convenience, different authors chose and still choose to make sense of the intricate patchwork of fiefdoms across Early Modern Europe in different ways, meaning that not only is there no agreed upon definition of which provinces were among the seventeen, some even disagree on the number seventeen itself.

The Pragmatic Sanction of 1549, which established the Netherlands as a cohesive administrative entity, lists the following provinces:

- Duchy of Brabant
- Duchy of Guelders and the County of Zutphen
- Duchy of Limburg (listed as "Limburg, Valkenburg, County of Dalhelm and Lands of Overmaas", the latter terms covering lands which were condominia of Brabant and the Prince-Bishopric of Liège)
- Duchy of Luxembourg
- County of Artois
- County of Flanders
- County of Hainaut
- County of Holland
- County of Namur
- County of Zeeland
- Lordship of Frisia
- Lordship of Mechelen
- Lordships of Overyssel (Latin: Transisulania) and Groningen
- Lordship of Utrecht
- Castellany of Lille and the Bailiwick of Douai and Orchies (part of the County of Flanders)

This totals fifteen provinces, but by counting Zutphen and Groningen separately, the number increases to seventeen; this is thought to be the origin of the number, though others attribute it Christian significance. In any case, it is a rather arbitrary one and even contemporary sources disagree on the composition and number of provinces. The Margraviate of Antwerp in particular was often counted as a fully-fledged province, while other lists omit it, counting it as part of Brabant. Some lists count the Tournaisis as a province, while others lump it together with Lillie, Douai and Orchies as "Walloon Flanders", despite there being no record of such a name having been used in the 16th century. Some modern lists may retroactively include the Territory of Drenthe, which was considered a province within the Dutch Republic, as one of the Seventeen Provinces.

== History ==
History of the Low Countries (schematic)
Frisii		Germanic tribes		Belgae & Celts			
Frisii	Cana– nefates (Note: Roman foederati)	Chamavi, Tubantes (Note: The Chamavi merged into the confederation of the Franks; the Tubantes merged into the confederation of the Saxons.)		Gallia Belgica (55 BC–c. 5th century AD); Germania Inferior (83–c. 5th century)			
Frisii	Cana– nefates	Salian Franks		Batavi			
unpopulated (4th –c. 5th centuries)		Saxons	Salian Franks (4th–c. 5th centuries)				
Frisian Kingdom (c. 6th century – 734)		Saxons	Frankish Kingdom (481–843)—Carolingian Empire (800–843)				
Frisian Kingdom (c. 6th century – 734)		Austrasia (511–687)					
Middle Francia (843–855)				West; Francia (from 843)	Middle Francia (843–855)		
Kingdom of Lotharingia (Note: Part of East Francia after 939, divided in Upper Lorraine (as part of West Francia) and Lower Lorraine (as part of East Francia) in 959.) (855–959); Duchy of Lower Lorraine (Note: Lower Lorraine—also referred to as Lothier—disintegrated into several smaller independent territories and only the title of a "Duke of Lothier" remained, held by Brabant.) (from 959)			Kingdom of Lotharingia (855–959); Duchy of Lower Lorraine (from 959)	West; Francia (from 843)	Kingdom of Lotharingia (855–959); Duchy of Lower Lorraine (from 959)		
Frisia			Kingdom of Lotharingia (855–959); Duchy of Lower Lorraine (from 959)	County of Flanders (Note: Including County of Artois (part of Flanders until 1237) and Tournaisis.) (862–1384)	Kingdom of Lotharingia (855–959); Duchy of Lower Lorraine (from 959)		
Frisian; Freedom (Note: Lordship of Frisia and Lordship of Groningen (including the Ommelanden) after 1524 and 1536 respectively.) (11th–16th centuries)	County of Holland (Note: Including County of Zeeland, that was ruled by neighboring County of Holland and County of Flanders (until 1432).) (880–1432)	Bishopric of Utrecht (Note: Utrecht included Lordship of Overijssel (until 1528), County of Drenthe (until 1528) and County of Zutphen (until 1182).) (695–1456)	Duchy of Brabant (Note: Duchy of Brabant included since 1288 also the Duchy of Limburg (now part of Belgium's Liège Province) and the "Overmaas" lands Dalhem, Valkenburg and Herzogenrath (now part of the Dutch Province of Limburg).) (1183–1430) Duchy of Guelders (Note: The county, later duchy, of Guelders consisted of four quarters, as they were separated by rivers: situated upstream Upper Quarter (the present day northern half of the Dutch province of Limburg), spatially separated from the three downstream Lower Quarters: County of Zutphen (after 1182), Veluwe Quarter and Nijmegen Quarter. The three lower quarters emerged from the historic gau Hamaland (named after the Chamavi tribe), and formed the present day province of Gelderland. Guelders did not include the Cleves enclave Huissen and the independent counties of Buren and Culemborg, that were much later seceded to the province of Gelderland.) (1046–1543)	County of Flanders (862–1384)	County of Hainaut (1071–1432) County of Namur (981–1421)	Prince- Bishopric of Liège (Note: Throughout the Middle Ages, the bishopric was further expanded with the Duchy of Bouillon in 1096 (ceded to France in 1678), the acquisition of the county of Loon in 1366 and the county of Horne in 1568. The Lordship of Mechelen was also part of the Prince-Bishopric of Liège.)(980–1791)	Duchy of Luxembourg (1059–1443)
Frisian; Freedom (11th–16th centuries)	Burgundian Netherlands (1384–1482)					Prince- Bishopric of Liège (980–1791)	Burgundian Netherlands (1384–1482)
Habsburg Netherlands (1482–1795) (Seventeen Provinces after 1543) (Note: The name Seventeen Provinces came in use after the Habsburg emperor Charles V had re-acquired the Duchy of Guelders, and an continuous territory arose.)						Prince- Bishopric of Liège (980–1791)	Habsburg Netherlands (1482–1795) (Seventeen Provinces after 1543)
Dutch Republic (1581–1795)				Spanish Netherlands (1556–1714)		Prince- Bishopric of Liège (980–1791)	Spanish Netherlands (1556–1714)
Dutch Republic (1581–1795)				Austrian Netherlands (1714–1795)		Prince- Bishopric of Liège (980–1791)	Austrian Netherlands (1714–1795)
Dutch Republic (1581–1795)				United States of Belgium (1790)		Republic of Liège (1789–'91)	United States of Belgium (1790)
Dutch Republic (1581–1795)				Austrian Netherlands (1795–1797)		P.-Bish. of Liège (1791–1794)	Austrian Netherlands (1795–1797)
Batavian Republic (1795–1806); Kingdom of Holland (1806–1810)			associated with French First Republic (1795–1804) part of First French Empire (1804–1815)				
part of First French Empire (1810–1813)			associated with French First Republic (1795–1804) part of First French Empire (1804–1815)				
Sovereign Principality of the Netherlands (1813–1815)			associated with French First Republic (1795–1804) part of First French Empire (1804–1815)				
United Kingdom of the Netherlands (1815–1830)							Grand Duchy of Luxembourg (from 1815)
Kingdom of the Netherlands (from 1839)				Kingdom of Belgium (from 1830)			Grand Duchy of Luxembourg (from 1815)
Kingdom of the Netherlands (from 1839)				Kingdom of Belgium (from 1830)			Grand Duchy of Luxembourg (from 1890)

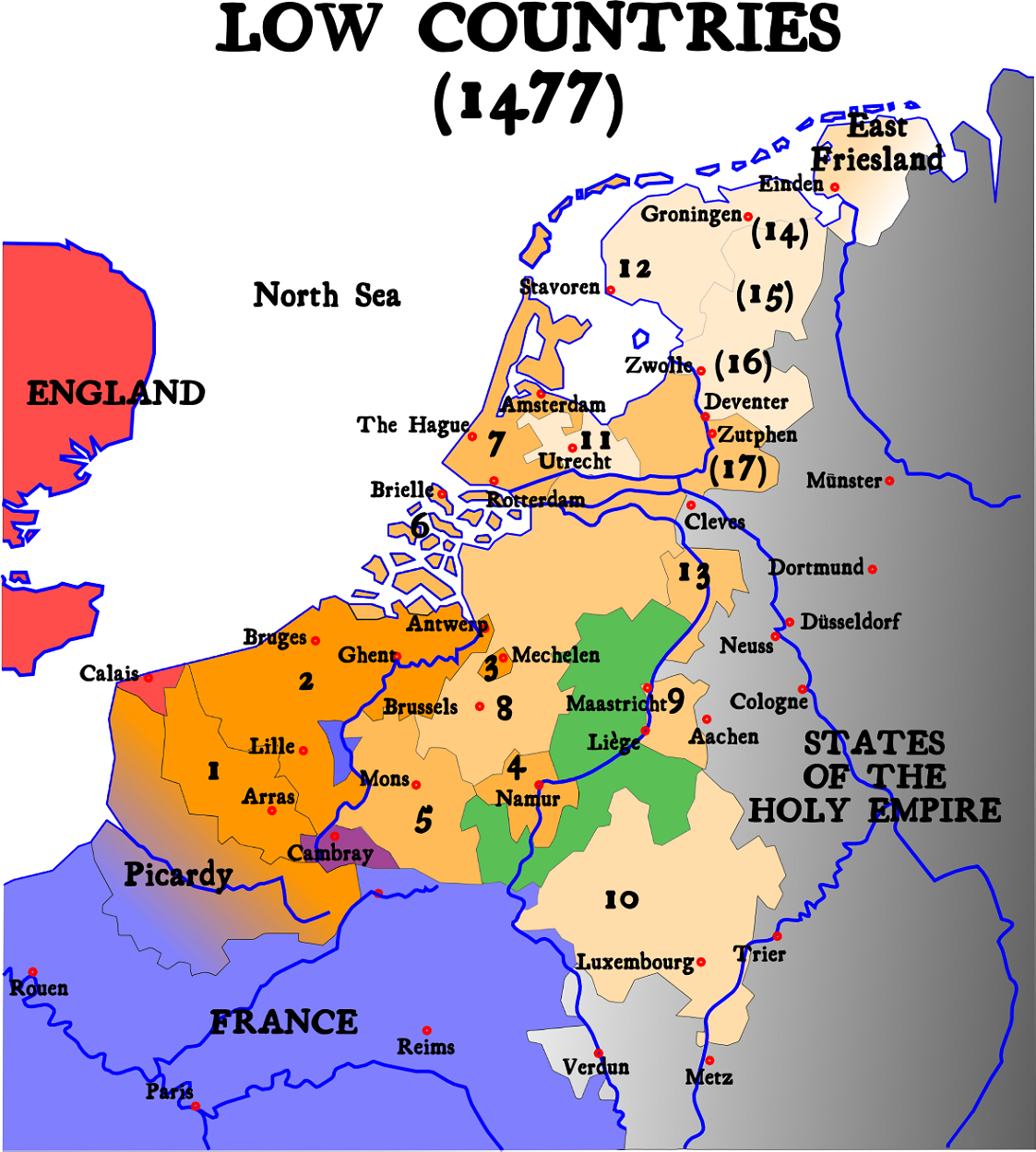
Map of the Low Countries in 1477

The Seventeen Provinces originated from the Burgundian Netherlands. The dukes of Burgundy systematically became the lords of different provinces. Mary I of Valois, Duchess of Burgundy was the last of the House of Burgundy.

Mary married Archduke Maximilian in 1477, and the provinces were acquired by the House of Habsburg on her death in 1482, with the exception of the Duchy of Burgundy itself, which, with an appeal to Salic law, had been reabsorbed into France upon the death of Mary's father, Charles the Bold. Maximilian and Mary's grandson, Charles V, Holy Roman Emperor and king of Spain, eventually united all 17 provinces under his rule, the last one being the Duchy of Guelders, in 1543.

Most of these provinces were fiefs of the Holy Roman Empire. Two provinces, the County of Flanders and the County of Artois, were originally French fiefs, but sovereignty was ceded to the Empire in the Treaty of Cambrai in 1529.

On 15 October 1506, in the palace of Mechelen, the future Charles V was recognized as Heer der Nederlanden ("Lord of the Netherlands"). Only he and his son ever used this title. The Pragmatic Sanction of 1549 determined that the Provinces should remain united in the future and inherited by the same monarch.

After Charles V's abdication in 1555, his realms were divided between his son, Philip II of Spain, and his brother, Ferdinand I, Holy Roman Emperor. The Seventeen Provinces went to his son, the king of Spain.

Conflicts between Philip II and his Dutch subjects led to the Eighty Years' War, which started in 1568. The seven northern provinces gained their independence as a republic called the Seven United Provinces. They were:

- the Lordship of Groningen and of the Ommelanden
- the Lordship of Friesland
- the Lordship of Overijssel
- the Duchy of Guelders (except its upper quarter) and the County of Zutphen
- the Prince-Bishopric, later Lordship of Utrecht
- the County of Holland
- the County of Zeeland

The southern provinces, Flanders, Brabant, Namur, Hainaut, Luxembourg and the others, were restored to Spanish rule due to the military and political talent of the Duke of Parma, especially at the Siege of Antwerp (1584–1585). Hence, these provinces became known as the Spanish Netherlands.

The County of Drenthe, surrounded by the other northern provinces, became de facto part of the Seven United Provinces, but had no voting rights in the Union of Utrecht and was therefore not considered a province.

The northern Seven United Provinces kept parts of Limburg, Brabant, and Flanders during the Eighty Years' War (see Generality Lands), which ended with the Treaty of Westphalia in 1648.

Artois and parts of Flanders and Hainaut (French Flanders and French Hainaut) were ceded to France in the course of the 17th and 18th centuries.

== Economy ==
By the mid-16th century, the Margraviate of Antwerp (Duchy of Brabant) had become the economic, political, and cultural centre of the Netherlands after its capital had shifted from the nearby Lordship of Mechelen to the city of Brussels.

Bruges (County of Flanders) had already lost its prominent position as the economic powerhouse of northern Europe, while Holland was gradually gaining importance in the 15th and 16th centuries.

However, after the revolt of the seven northern provinces (1568), the Sack of Antwerp (1576), the Fall of Antwerp (1584–1585), and the resulting closure of the Scheldt river to navigation, a large number of people from the southern provinces emigrated north to the new republic. The centre of prosperity moved from cities in the south such as Bruges, Antwerp, Ghent, and Brussels to cities in the north, mostly in Holland, including Amsterdam, The Hague, and Rotterdam.

== Netherlands ==
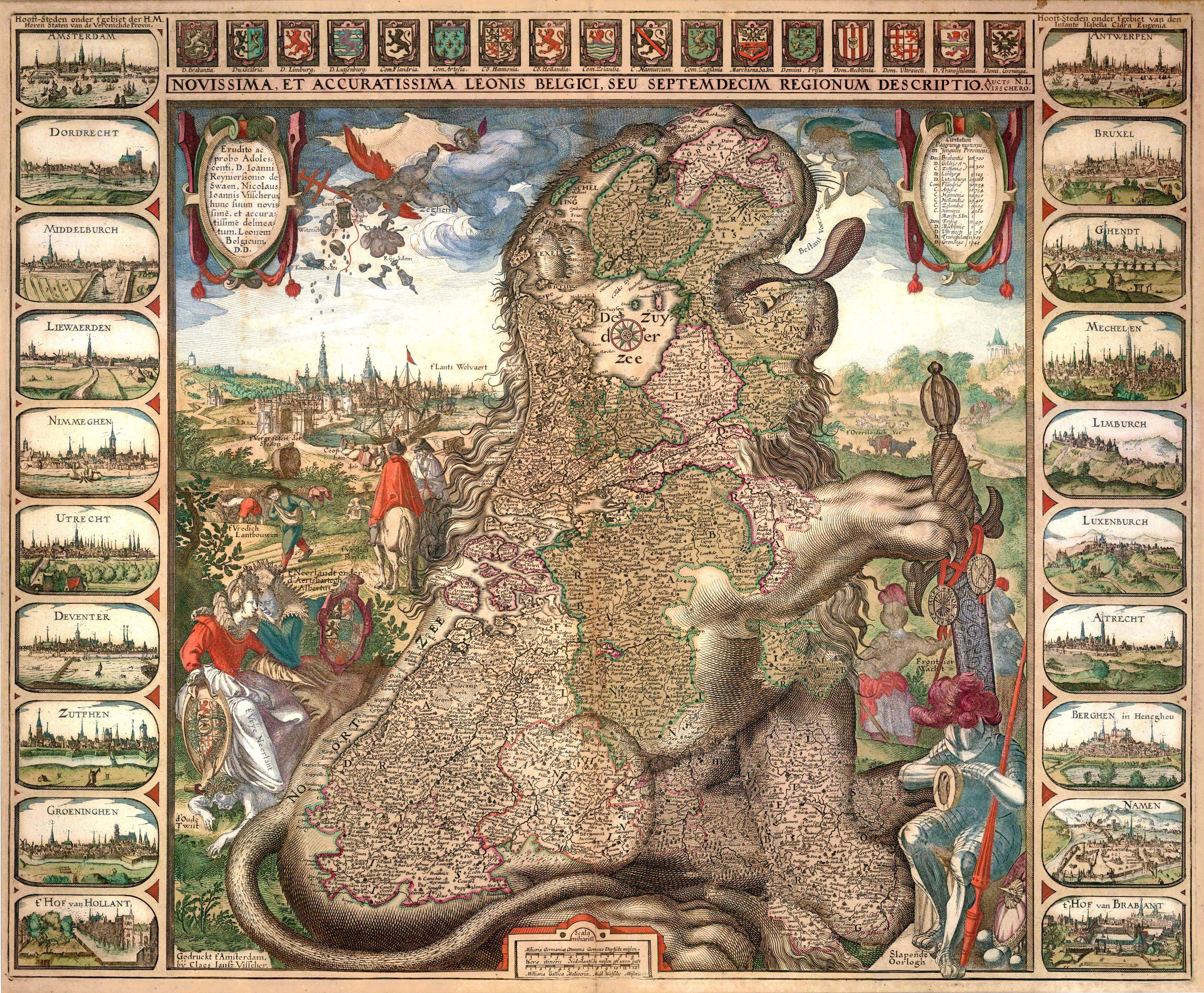
Leo Belgicus map

To distinguish between the older and larger Low Countries of the Netherlands from the current country of the Netherlands, Dutch speakers usually drop the plural for the latter. They speak of Nederland in the singular for the current country and of de Nederlanden in the plural for the integral domains of Charles V.

In other languages, this has not been adopted, though the larger area is sometimes known as the Low Countries in English.

The fact that the term Netherlands has such different historical meanings can sometimes lead to difficulties in expressing oneself correctly. For example, composers from the 16th century are often said to belong to the Dutch School (Nederlandse School). Although they themselves would not have objected to that term at that time, nowadays it may wrongly create the impression that they were from the current Netherlands. In fact, they were almost exclusively from current Belgium.

== Flanders ==
The same confusion exists around the word Flanders. Historically, it applied to the County of Flanders, corresponding roughly with the present-day provinces of West Flanders, East Flanders and French Flanders, plus the part of Zeeland south of the river Scheldt. However, when the Dutch-speaking population of Belgium sought more rights in the 19th century, the word Flanders was reused, this time to refer to the Dutch-speaking part of Belgium, which is larger and contains only part of the old county of Flanders (see Flemish Movement). Therefore, the territory of the County of Flanders and that of present-day Flanders do not fully match:

- French Flanders belonged to the County of Flanders, but is today part of France.
- Zeelandic Flanders belonged to the County of Flanders, but is today part of the Netherlands.
- Tournai and the Tournaisis was some period considered as part of the County of Flanders, but is today part of Wallonia.
- The present-day Belgian province of Flemish Brabant belongs to present-day Flanders, but was part of the Duchy of Brabant.
- The present-day Belgian province of Antwerp belongs to present-day Flanders, but was part of the Duchy of Brabant.
- The present-day Belgian province of Limburg belongs to present-day Flanders, but was part of the Prince-Bishopric of Liège.

This explains, for instance, why the province of East Flanders is not situated in the east of present-day Flanders.

== See also ==
- Governors of the Habsburg Netherlands
- The Netherlands (disambiguation)
- Burgundian Netherlands
- Pan-Netherlands
- French Flemish
- Benelux
