= Maarten van Rossum =

Dutch field marshal (1478–1555)

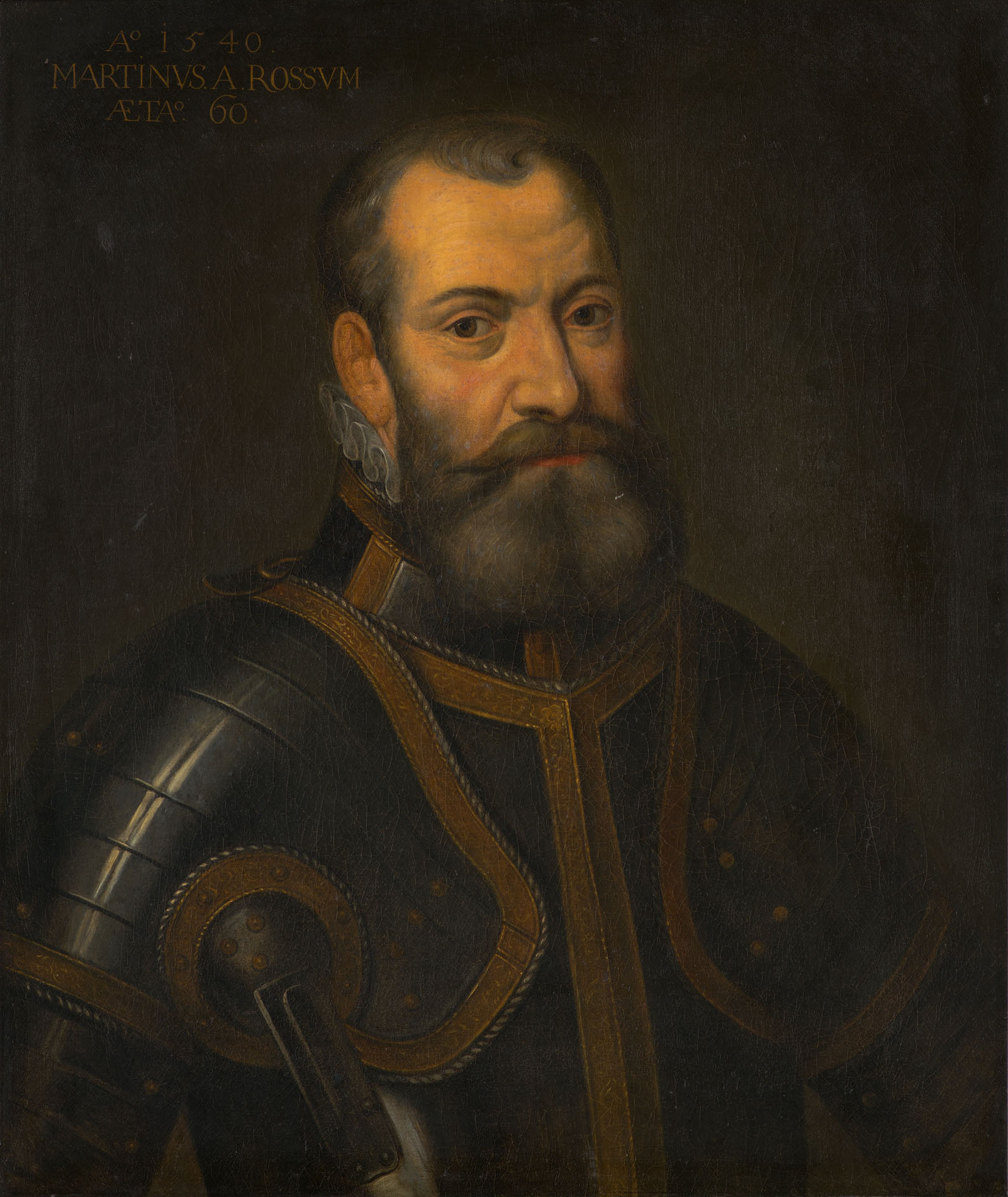
19th century portrait of Van Rossum

Maarten van Rossum (c. 1478 – 7 June 1555) was a military tactician of the duchy of Guelders who became field marshal in the service of Charles, Duke of Guelders. He was greatly feared outside his home country for the ruthless manner in which he waged war. In a long career, he often put his motto ""Blaken en branden is het sieraad van de oorlog" ("Burning and torching is the jewel of war") into practice. His way of waging war was quite similar to that of his Italian colleagues, the condottieri, and was characterized by guerrilla-like tactics, in which the civilian population was spared even less than was usual in his time.

For thirty years he served the interests of the Dukes of Guelders in their struggle to safeguard the independence of the Duchy of Guelders against the Habsburg Netherlands of Charles V. Van Rossum had a number of military successes obtained through his use of ruses, daring and the indiscriminate destruction of civilian lives and property. After the collapse of the Duchy of Guelders, he fought the last years of his life in the service of his old enemy Emperor Charles V against France.

== Life ==
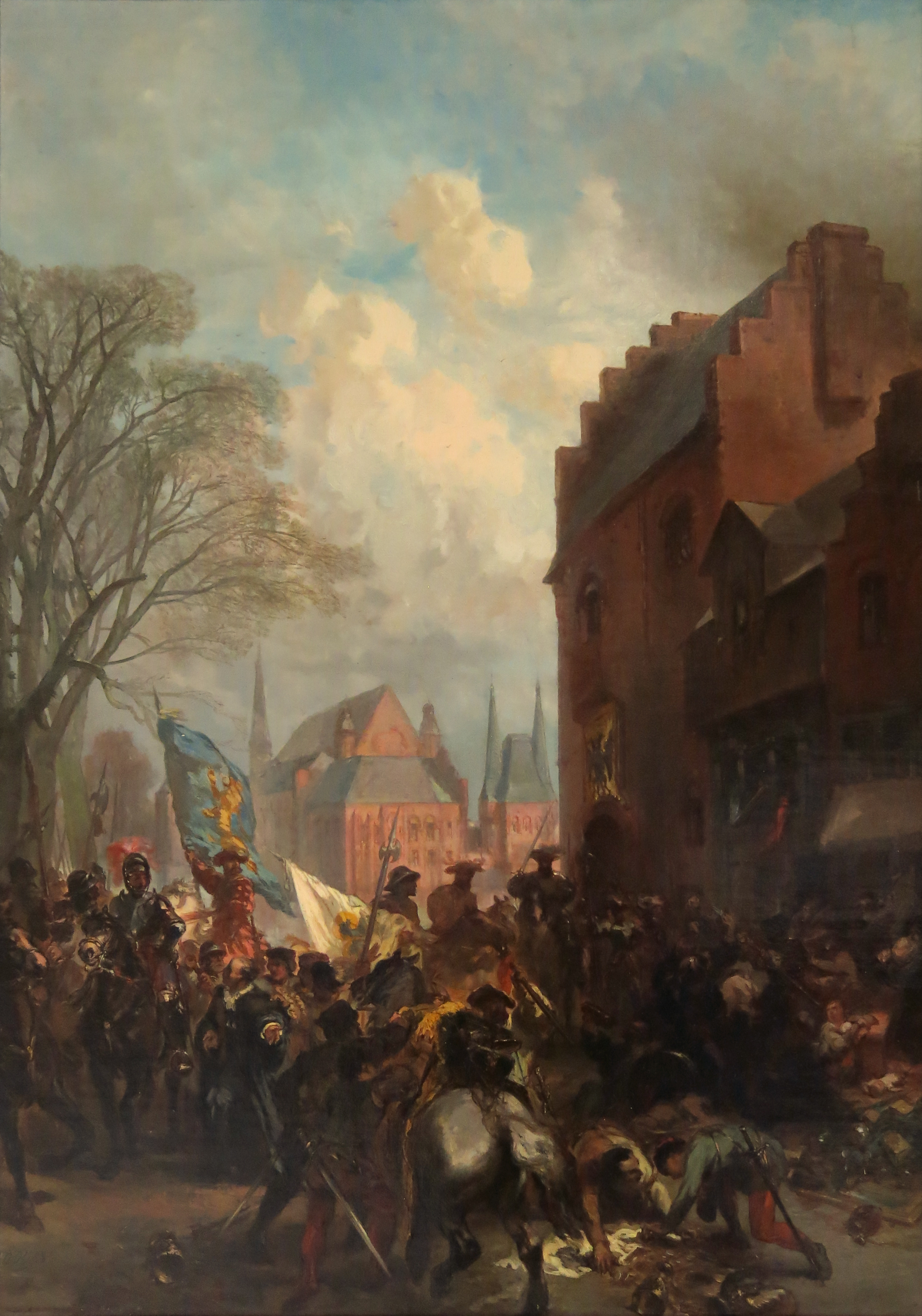
Maarten van Rossum's sack of The Hague in 1528, by Charles Rochussen.

Van Rossum was born in Zaltbommel. His parents, Johan van Rossum, lord of Rossum and Johanna van Hemert probably married before 1478 and were part of the lower nobility around Bommelerwaard. During his life Maarten acquired the titles of lord of Poederoijen, Cannenburgh, Lathum, Baer and Bredevoort, field marshal of Guelders and Imperial stadholder of Luxembourg.

He is known to have been an experienced commander and is renowned for actions while serving Charles of Guelders in his Guelders Wars against Charles V. He is also known for his participation in the sack of The Hague in 1528.

After the death of Charles II, Duke of Guelders, van Rossum swore allegiance to his successor William, Duke of Jülich-Cleves-Berg. In the third and final phase of the Gelderland wars, he managed to establish an alliance of the Duchy of Guelders with the kings of France (Francis I of France) and Denmark (Christian III of Denmark). This gave van Rossum the opportunity to conduct a serious campaign against the Habsburgs. It came to an attack on the duchy of Brabant, the principal territory of the Habsburg Netherlands. Van Rossum assembled an army force of more than 15,000 men in the south of Gelderland. The war was declared on 15 July 1542. He then entered Brabant, where he burned down much of the countryside.

Van Rossum had initially planned to cross the Meuse in Maastricht to travel west via Leuven. These plans, however, fell into the hands of Mary of Hungary. This forced the Gelderland troops to cross the Meuse near Nijmegen. The Gelderland army marched through De Peel and plundered and burned. On the way to the south, he plundered what was then Rode (now Sint-Oedenrode). The parish church was not spared and the village was burned down. On 26 July 1543, he attacked Vught and burned down the village.

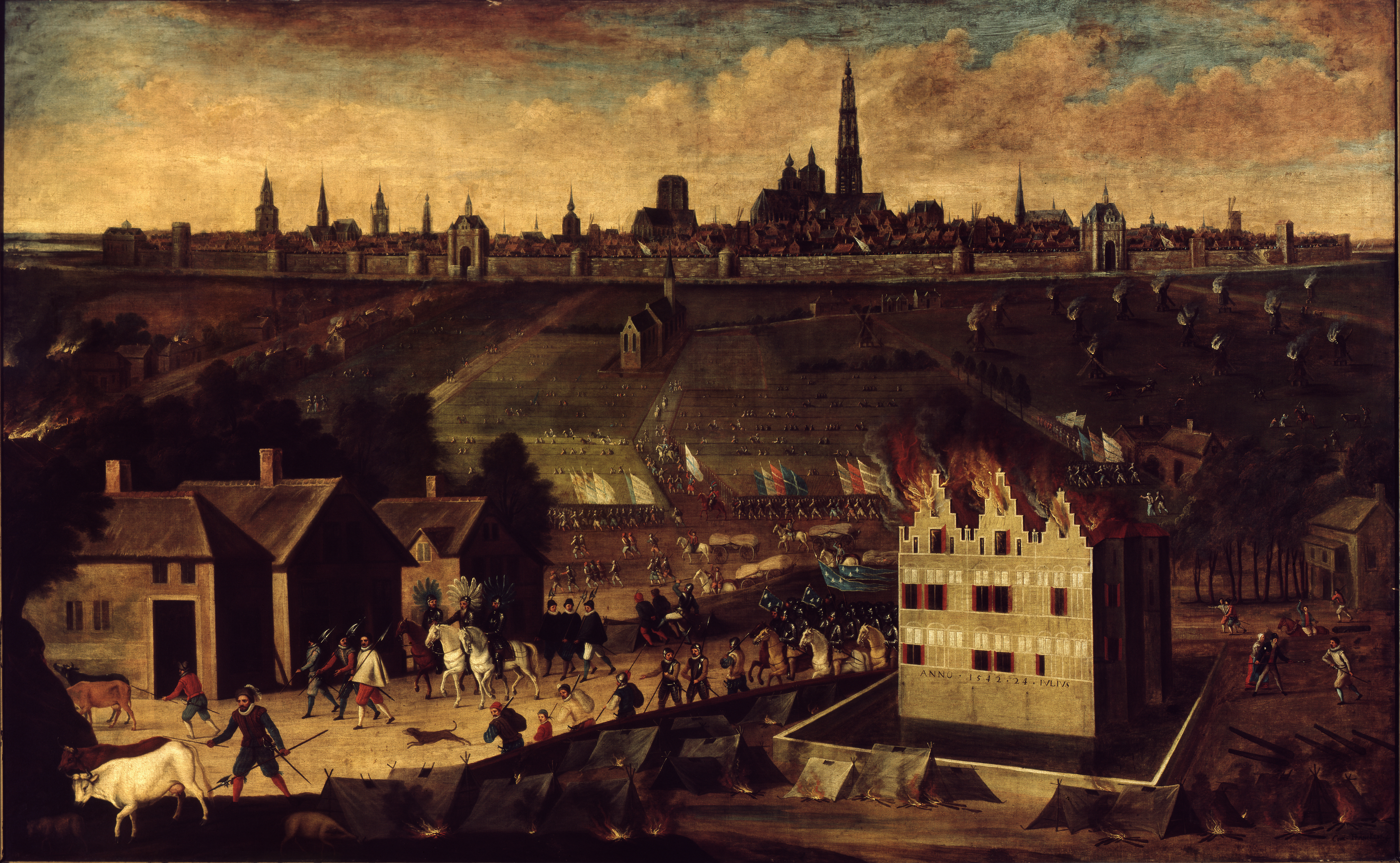
Maarten van Rossum's departure after his attack on Antwerp on 24 July 1542, by Constantijn Francken, c. 1700

After the unsuccessful sieges of Lier and Leuven, his army moved on to Antwerp. Van Rossum laid siege to this city, at that time the most important trading centre of Western Europe. In a battle for the gates of Antwerp, near the present-day Brasschaat, he defeated an army led by René of Chalon, the then Prince of Orange. In addition, about 2,000 people were killed on the Habsburg side. Van Rossum had deployed his infantry behind his 'Black riders'. This went unnoticed by the Habsburgs army, who boldly attacked van Rossum's cavalry. Before and after his victory van Rossum burned completely down the surroundings of Antwerp and Leuven. As a result, according to contemporaries, the surroundings of Antwerp remained rural throughout the 16th century, in contrast to previous centuries. However, van Rossum did not succeed in actually taking over these important two cities. An attack on the walls of Antwerp was repulsed.

In 1542/43, the Brabant campaign led to a stream of pamphlets rolling off the Antwerp presses. The question was asked which of the two 'Maartens' was worse, Martin Luther or Maarten van Rossum. Naturally, those directly involved saw Maarten van Rossum as the greater evil. The Antwerp poet Anna Bijns, on the other hand, was of the opinion that Martin Luther's action was much more harmful: Van Rossum torments bodies, but Luther destroys souls.

In the spring of 1555 van Rossum became seriously ill, possibly infected with the Black Death or typhus in the city of Charlemont. He died in Antwerp on June 7, 1555, and his body was buried at his birthplace, the village of Rossum.

== In popular culture ==
He was respected during his life and after his death for his military ability and feared for his cruelty. It is an image that has been propagated by historians since the 17th century. In the 19th and 20th centuries, van Rossum figured in this role in historical novels and youth books. This image of the villain was continued by his role as an antagonist in the 1960s Dutch TV series Floris.
