= Charles II of Guelders =

Dutch duke and count (1467–1538)

Charles II
- Duke of Guelders; Count of Zutphen; Lord of Groningen
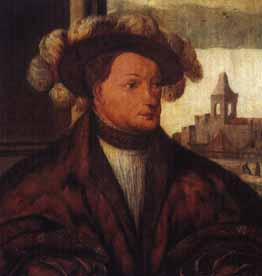
- Charles II, Duke of Guelders

Duke of Guelders; Count of Zutphen
- Reign: 1492 - 30 June 1538
- Predecessor: Philip I
- Successor: William II

Lord of Groningen
- Reign: 2 November 1514 - 10 December 1536
- Predecessor: Edzard I
- Successor: Charles V
- Born: 9 November 1464; Grave
- Died: 30 June 1538 (aged 73); Arnhem
- Spouse: Elisabeth of Brunswick-Lüneburg
- House: House of Egmond
- Father: Adolf of Egmond
- Mother: Catherine of Bourbon

Charles II (9 November 1464– 30 June 1538) was a member of the House of Egmond who ruled as Duke of Guelders and Count of Zutphen from 1492 until his death. He had a principal role in the Frisian peasant rebellion and the Guelders Wars.

== Life ==
Charles was the son of Adolf of Egmond and Catherine of Bourbon. He born either at Arnhem or at Grave, and raised at the Burgundian court of Charles the Bold, who had bought the duchy of Guelders from Adolf of Egmond in 1473. Charles fought in several battles against the armies of Charles VIII of France, until he was captured in the Battle of Béthune in 1487.

King Maximilian subsequently managed to acquire the Burgundian lands for the Habsburgs by marriage. In 1492, the citizens of Guelders, disenchanted with Maximilian's rule, ransomed Charles and recognized him as their duke. As duke his regent was his aunt Catherine. Charles was supported by the French King, but in 1505, Guelders was regained by King Maximilian's son Philip the Handsome. Charles had to accompany Philip to Spain to attend Philip's coronation as King of Castile but at Antwerp, Charles managed to escape. Shortly afterwards, Philip died in Spain and by July 1513 Charles had regained control over the whole of Guelders. In his conflict with the Habsburgs, Charles also became a major player behind the scenes of the Frisian peasant rebellion and at first financially supported the rebel leader Pier Gerlofs Donia. After the tides turned against the rebels, Charles stopped his support and switched sides together with his military commander Maarten van Rossum. In the Treaty of Gorinchem (1528), Emperor Charles, son of Philip the Handsome, proposed to recognize Charles of Egmond as Duke of Guelders under the condition that he would inherit the Duchy should the Duke die without issue. The Duke, who at the time did not have any children, delayed signing the treaty. Another battle ensued, after which the passage was removed from the treaty. In 1536 there was finally peace between Guelders and Burgundy with the Treaty of Grave.

In 1531, Charles II turned against his former ally, the County of East Frisia. The Lutheran counts of East Frisia were locked in a struggle with Balthasar Oomkens, the lord of Esens, Stedesdorf, and Wittmund. Balthasar was driven from his territory by Enno II of East Frisia and turned to the Catholic Charles II for help. Balthasar ceded his territory to the duke in exchange for aid against the East Frisians. Thus, in 1531, the Guelderian Feud broke out when Meindert von Hamme, the Guelderian army commander, invaded East Frisia and wreaked havoc. Count Enno II and Johan I were no match for this overwhelming force and accepted their defeat in 1534. Balthasar's rule was thus secured.

Charles died at Arnhem, and is buried in the St. Eusebius Church there.

== Family ==
In 1519, Charles married young Elisabeth of Brunswick-Lüneburg (1494–1572). The marriage remained childless. Charles however fathered several illegitimate children.

His only legitimate (twin) sister, Philippa (1464–1547), survived him and died during the reign of her great-grandson, Charles III, Duke of Lorraine (1543–1608).

== Sources ==
- Nijsten, Gerard (2004). In the Shadow of Burgundy: The Court of Guelders in the Late Middle Ages. Cambridge University Press.
- Simpson, Grant G. (1996). Scotland and the Low Countries 1124–1994. Tuckwell Publishers.

Charles II of Guelders House of Egmond Born: 9 November 1467 Died: 30 June 1538
Regnal titles
Preceded by Philip I	Duke of Guelders; 1492–1538	Succeeded by William II
