= Treaty of Gorinchem =

1528 treaty between Holy Roman Emperor Charles V and Duke Charles of Guelders

The Treaty of Gorinchem was signed in Gorinchem on 20 October 1528 between Holy Roman Emperor Charles V and Duke Charles of Guelders during the Guelders Wars.

Based on the terms of the accord, the Emperor acknowledged Duke Charles' control of Guelders, Groningen, and Drente, but as fiefdoms of the Emperor. Duke Charles agreed to name Emperor Charles as his successor.
The treaty was broken in 1534 when Duke Charles nominated King Francis I of France as his successor.

== See also ==
- List of treaties
