= Georg Schenck van Toutenburg =

Dutch stadtholder (1480–1540)

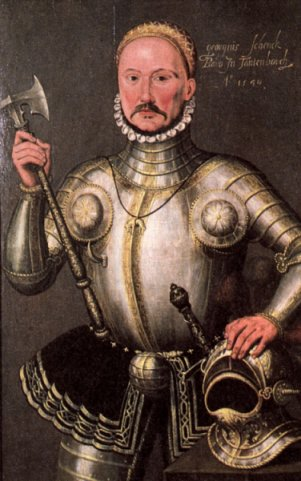
George Schenk van Toutenburg

Georg Schenck van Toutenburg (German - Georg Schenk von Tautenburg) (1480 – 2 February 1540) was Stadhouder of Friesland (1521-1540). Later he was also Stadholder of Overijssel, Drenthe and Groningen. His son Frederick was the first archbishop of Utrecht.

Georg was born in Windischeschenbach, and succeeded Wilhelm van Roggendorf as Stadhouder of Friesland.

Georg built the Toutenburg in Vollenhove, where he had been appointed bailiff. He succeeded in pushing back the Guelders led by Christoffel, Count of Meurs. Jancko Douwama came into conflict with Schenck, but lost. Schenck captured Dokkum (see J. of Golstein), and ultimately Sloten and Lemmer. He took the war out of Friesland, fighting Charles, Duke of Guelders in the Guelders Wars, becoming stadholder of Overijssel, defeating the Anabaptists at Bloemkamp, and also capturing Groningen and Drenthe (1536) after the Battle of Heiligerlee, where he also became stadholder. Friesland's current administrative structures owe much to him. Under his administration the Protestants gained power, despite strict bans.

He died in Vollenhove, aged about sixty.

== Marriage and issue ==
Married firstly Anna de Vos had issue;

- Friedrich
- Ludwig
- Maria
- Georg Tudius

Married secondly Johanna of Egmont, daughter of John III of Egmont and Catherine of Werdenburg. Had issue;

- Karl
- Georg
- Johann

== Sources ==
- (in Dutch) Brouwer, J.H., J.J. Kalma, W. Kok, en M. Wiegersma, red., Encyclopedie van Friesland, (Amsterdam: Elsevier, 1958), Georg Schenck van Toutenburg.
