= Lordship of Groningen =

Habsburg-ruled region of the Netherlands

Lordship of Groningen Heerlijkheid Groningen Hearlikheid Grinslân
- 1506–1594
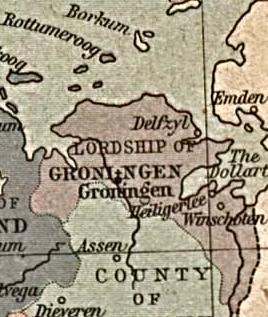
- Capital: Groningen
- Government: Heerlijkheid
- History
  - Established: 1506
  - Battle of Heiligerlee: August 5, 1536
  - Treaty of Grave: December 10, 1536
  - 'Betrayel' of Rennenberg: March 3, 1580
  - Siege of Groningen: July 22, 1594
Preceded by	Succeeded by
Free Imperial City of Groningen	Stad en Lande
- Today part of: Groningen

The Lordship of Groningen (Dutch: Heerlijkheid Groningen; West Frisian: Hearlikheid Grinslân) was a lordship under the rule of the House of Habsburg between 1506 and 1594, which is the present-day province of Groningen.

== Before 1536 ==
A distinction must be made between Groningen and the surrounding countryside, known as the Ommelanden. The city of Groningen had already gained its independence from its formal landlord, the Bishop of Utrecht in the 12th century. The Ommelanden, together with their Frisian neighbours, enjoyed the Frisian freedom and had never had a Lord. Therefore, before 1536, the concept of a Lord of Groningen had never existed de jure.

== Charles V ==
After the Habsburg victory in the Battle of Heiligerlee during the Guelders Wars, the city of Groningen and the Ommelanden came under the rule of Charles V, Holy Roman Emperor. They were joined in the Lordship of Groningen and ruled by a Stadtholder, but with preservation of their ancient rights and privileges. Because of the predominant position of the city, the union was never very successful. In 1548 the Lordship of Groningen became part of the Burgundian Circle.

== Dutch rebellion ==
When the Union of Utrecht was signed in 1579, the Lordship of Groningen also joined. But there was much more enthusiasm in the Ommelanden, who saw this as an opportunity to regain their independence from the city, than in Groningen itself. In March 1580, Stadtholder George van Lalaing succeeded in convincing the city of Groningen to leave the Union of Utrecht and to remain loyal to the King of Spain. The city now became a northern bastion for the Spanish in the Eighty Years' War, but they lost more and more territory until the city was taken in the siege in 1594.

The lordship was abolished but the city and the Ommelanden remained united in one province. Groningen and the Ommelanden became part of the Republic of the Seven United Netherlands.

== Lords ==
=== House of Cirksena ===

- 1506-1514: Edzard I (de facto)

=== House of Egmond ===

- 1514-1536: Charles II (de facto)

=== House of Habsburg ===

- 1536-1555: Charles V
- 1555-1594: Philip II
