= Lists of rulers in the Low Countries =

Chronological index of rulers in the Low Countries

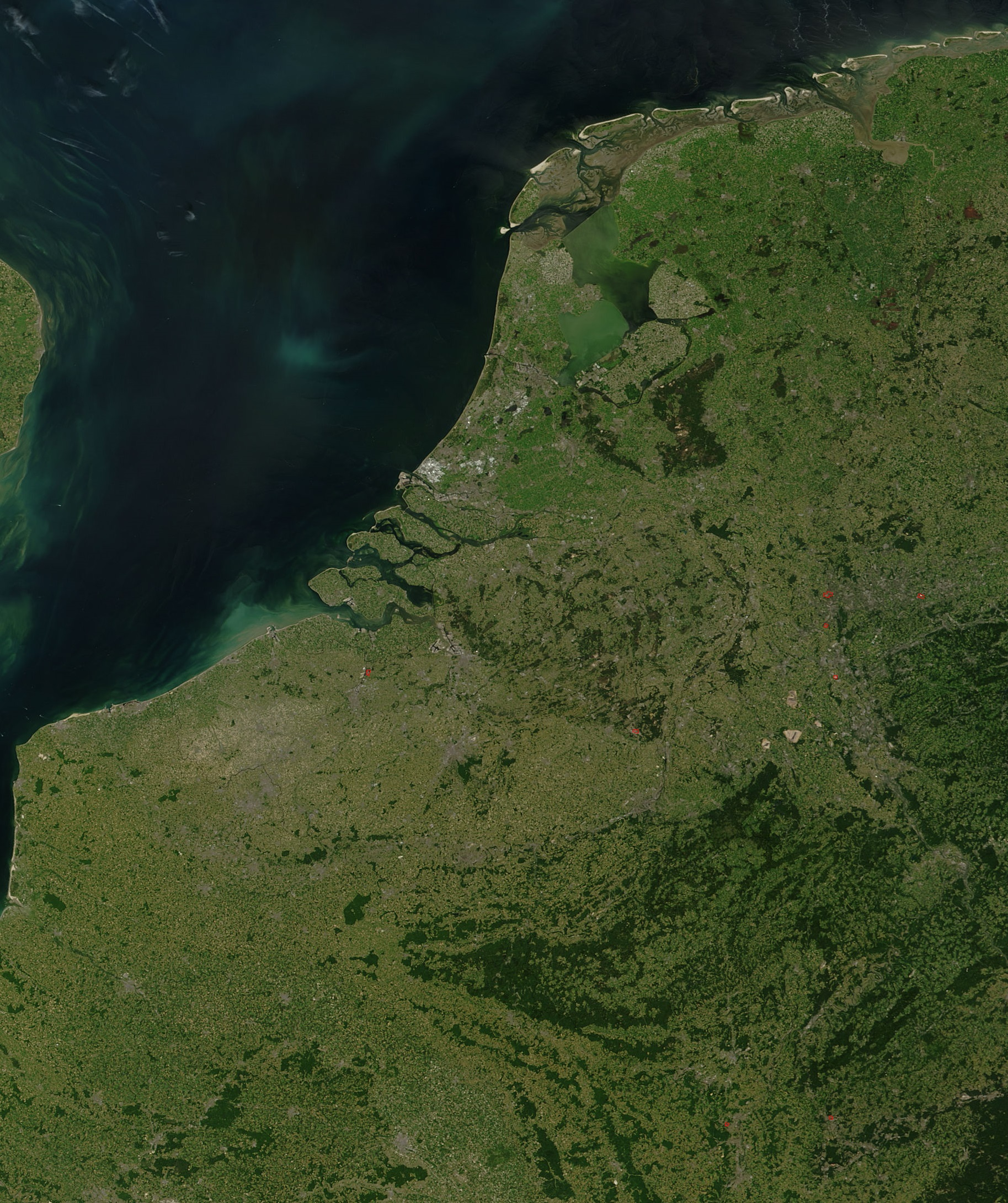
The Rhine–Meuse–Scheldt Delta of the Low Countries

History of the Low Countries (schematic)
Frisii		Germanic tribes		Belgae & Celts			
Frisii	Cana– nefates (Note: Roman foederati)	Chamavi, Tubantes (Note: The Chamavi merged into the confederation of the Franks; the Tubantes merged into the confederation of the Saxons.)		Gallia Belgica (55 BC–c. 5th century AD); Germania Inferior (83–c. 5th century)			
Frisii	Cana– nefates	Salian Franks		Batavi			
unpopulated (4th –c. 5th centuries)		Saxons	Salian Franks (4th–c. 5th centuries)				
Frisian Kingdom (c. 6th century – 734)		Saxons	Frankish Kingdom (481–843)—Carolingian Empire (800–843)				
Frisian Kingdom (c. 6th century – 734)		Austrasia (511–687)					
Middle Francia (843–855)				West; Francia (from 843)	Middle Francia (843–855)		
Kingdom of Lotharingia (Note: Part of East Francia after 939, divided in Upper Lorraine (as part of West Francia) and Lower Lorraine (as part of East Francia) in 959.) (855–959); Duchy of Lower Lorraine (Note: Lower Lorraine—also referred to as Lothier—disintegrated into several smaller independent territories and only the title of a "Duke of Lothier" remained, held by Brabant.) (from 959)			Kingdom of Lotharingia (855–959); Duchy of Lower Lorraine (from 959)	West; Francia (from 843)	Kingdom of Lotharingia (855–959); Duchy of Lower Lorraine (from 959)		
Frisia			Kingdom of Lotharingia (855–959); Duchy of Lower Lorraine (from 959)	County of Flanders (Note: Including County of Artois (part of Flanders until 1237) and Tournaisis.) (862–1384)	Kingdom of Lotharingia (855–959); Duchy of Lower Lorraine (from 959)		
Frisian; Freedom (Note: Lordship of Frisia and Lordship of Groningen (including the Ommelanden) after 1524 and 1536 respectively.) (11th–16th centuries)	County of Holland (Note: Including County of Zeeland, that was ruled by neighboring County of Holland and County of Flanders (until 1432).) (880–1432)	Bishopric of Utrecht (Note: Utrecht included Lordship of Overijssel (until 1528), County of Drenthe (until 1528) and County of Zutphen (until 1182).) (695–1456)	Duchy of Brabant (Note: Duchy of Brabant included since 1288 also the Duchy of Limburg (now part of Belgium's Liège Province) and the "Overmaas" lands Dalhem, Valkenburg and Herzogenrath (now part of the Dutch Province of Limburg).) (1183–1430) Duchy of Guelders (Note: The county, later duchy, of Guelders consisted of four quarters, as they were separated by rivers: situated upstream Upper Quarter (the present day northern half of the Dutch province of Limburg), spatially separated from the three downstream Lower Quarters: County of Zutphen (after 1182), Veluwe Quarter and Nijmegen Quarter. The three lower quarters emerged from the historic gau Hamaland (named after the Chamavi tribe), and formed the present day province of Gelderland. Guelders did not include the Cleves enclave Huissen and the independent counties of Buren and Culemborg, that were much later seceded to the province of Gelderland.) (1046–1543)	County of Flanders (862–1384)	County of Hainaut (1071–1432) County of Namur (981–1421)	Prince- Bishopric of Liège (Note: Throughout the Middle Ages, the bishopric was further expanded with the Duchy of Bouillon in 1096 (ceded to France in 1678), the acquisition of the county of Loon in 1366 and the county of Horne in 1568. The Lordship of Mechelen was also part of the Prince-Bishopric of Liège.)(980–1791)	Duchy of Luxembourg (1059–1443)
Frisian; Freedom (11th–16th centuries)	Burgundian Netherlands (1384–1482)					Prince- Bishopric of Liège (980–1791)	Burgundian Netherlands (1384–1482)
Habsburg Netherlands (1482–1795) (Seventeen Provinces after 1543) (Note: The name Seventeen Provinces came in use after the Habsburg emperor Charles V had re-acquired the Duchy of Guelders, and an continuous territory arose.)						Prince- Bishopric of Liège (980–1791)	Habsburg Netherlands (1482–1795) (Seventeen Provinces after 1543)
Dutch Republic (1581–1795)				Spanish Netherlands (1556–1714)		Prince- Bishopric of Liège (980–1791)	Spanish Netherlands (1556–1714)
Dutch Republic (1581–1795)				Austrian Netherlands (1714–1795)		Prince- Bishopric of Liège (980–1791)	Austrian Netherlands (1714–1795)
Dutch Republic (1581–1795)				United States of Belgium (1790)		Republic of Liège (1789–'91)	United States of Belgium (1790)
Dutch Republic (1581–1795)				Austrian Netherlands (1795–1797)		P.-Bish. of Liège (1791–1794)	Austrian Netherlands (1795–1797)
Batavian Republic (1795–1806); Kingdom of Holland (1806–1810)			associated with French First Republic (1795–1804) part of First French Empire (1804–1815)				
part of First French Empire (1810–1813)			associated with French First Republic (1795–1804) part of First French Empire (1804–1815)				
Sovereign Principality of the Netherlands (1813–1815)			associated with French First Republic (1795–1804) part of First French Empire (1804–1815)				
United Kingdom of the Netherlands (1815–1830)							Grand Duchy of Luxembourg (from 1815)
Kingdom of the Netherlands (from 1839)				Kingdom of Belgium (from 1830)			Grand Duchy of Luxembourg (from 1815)
Kingdom of the Netherlands (from 1839)				Kingdom of Belgium (from 1830)			Grand Duchy of Luxembourg (from 1890)

These are lists of rulers in the Low Countries. The Low Countries, historically also called the Netherlands, possessed clearly delineated boundaries only after 1500. Still in many respects they demonstrated common traits and underwent similar development that differentiated them from surrounding countries. The social, economic and political similarities evident throughout most of the region stem from the High Middle Ages, when the Scheldt, Maas and Rhine delta area became an important center of trade. Next to Northern Italy, the Low Countries became the most urbanised and prosperous region in Europe. Its political system exhibited, from relatively early on, a degree of representative government that differed from the more feudal arrangements then existent in much of Europe. Internationally, the region served both as a mediator for and a buffer to the surrounding great powers, France, England, and Germany.

== Origins (before 800) ==
=== Tribal rulers ===
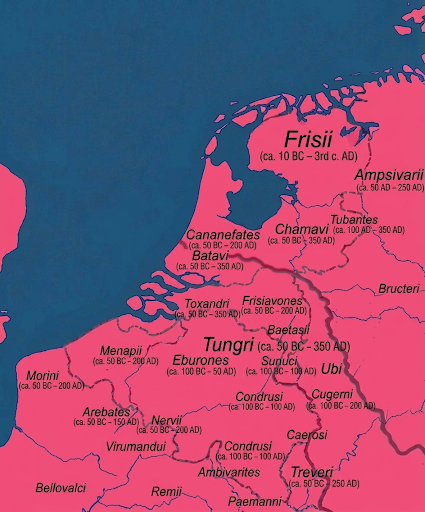
Tribes in the Low Countries as recorded by the Romans (present-day borders superimposed)

- Nervii (57 BC), Boduognatus, commander of the Nervii at the Battle of the Sabis against Julius Caesar, in the southern Low Countries.
- Morini (56–55 BC), unnamed leaders whose people avoided pitched battle by withdrawing into forests and marshes and later attacked Roman troops returning from Caesar’s first expedition to Britain, in the southwestern coastal Low Countries and adjacent northern Gaul.
- Menapii (56–53 BC), unnamed leaders whose people relied on forests and marshes in their resistance to Caesar, in the western Low Countries around the lower Scheldt and the Rhine–Meuse delta.
- Eburones (54–53 BC), Ambiorix and Catuvolcus, co-rulers who led the ambush of a Roman legion and the subsequent revolt against Caesar, in the eastern southern Low Countries between the Meuse and Rhine, including present-day Liège and Belgian and Dutch Limburg.
- Tubantes (14 AD), unnamed tribal leaders whose forces joined the Bructeri and Usipetes in attacking the returning army of Germanicus, traditionally associated with Twente and the surrounding eastern Low Countries.
- Frisii (58 AD), Malorix and Verritus, described by Tacitus as rulers of their people, who travelled to Rome to petition Emperor Nero for permission to settle on land along the Rhine, representing the northern coastal Low Countries.
- Cananefates (47 and 69 AD), Gannascus, a Cananefatian deserter who led Chaucian raiders against the Roman coast in 47, and Brinno, who was chosen to lead the Cananefatian revolt in 69, in the western Rhine–Meuse delta of the coastal western Low Countries.
- Batavi (69–70 AD), Gaius Julius Civilis, a Roman-trained Batavian leader who led the Revolt of the Batavi during the Year of the Four Emperors, from Batavia in the central Rhine–Meuse delta of the central Low Countries.
- Bructeri (69–70 AD), Veleda, a prophetess who exercised considerable religious and political influence over the Batavian-led coalition in the eastern Low Countries from Bructerian territory east of the Rhine.
- Chamavi (358 AD), King Nebisgast, attested during Emperor Julian’s campaign against the Chamavi along the eastern Rhine frontier of the Low Countries.

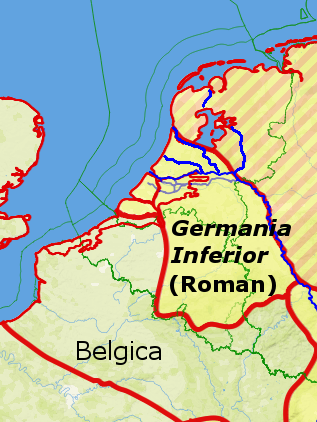
Roman provinces Germania Inferior and Gallia Belgica

=== Roman rulers ===
- List of Roman governors of Gallia Belgica (ca. 22 BC–5th century), imperial administrators of the Roman province that encompassed most of the southern Low Countries.
- List of Roman governors of Germania Inferior (ca. 85–5th century), imperial administrators of the Roman province along the Lower Rhine, including the Rhine-delta territories of the Batavi and Cananefates.

The Low Countries as part of Frisia and northwestern Austrasia

=== Frankish rulers ===
- List of Salian rulers (ca. 388–511), rulers of Salian Frankish groups traditionally associated with present-day Salland in the northeastern Low Countries, later established in Batavia and Texandria, and eventually centred on Tournai in the southern Low Countries.
- List of rulers of Austrasia (511–751), rulers of the northeastern Frankish kingdom, whose northwestern territories included substantial parts of the southern and eastern Low Countries.
- List of Frankish kings (751–800), the Carolingian rulers under whom the southern Low Countries remained fully integrated into the Frankish realm, while the Frisian and Saxon territories in the northern and eastern Low Countries were gradually conquered and incorporated.

=== Frisian rulers ===
- List of rulers of Frisia (ca. 600–775), rulers associated with early medieval Frisia along the North Sea coast of the northern Low Countries, with Dorestad serving as a major commercial centre in the central river area contested by Frisians and Franks.

=== Ecclesiastical rulers with later temporal power ===
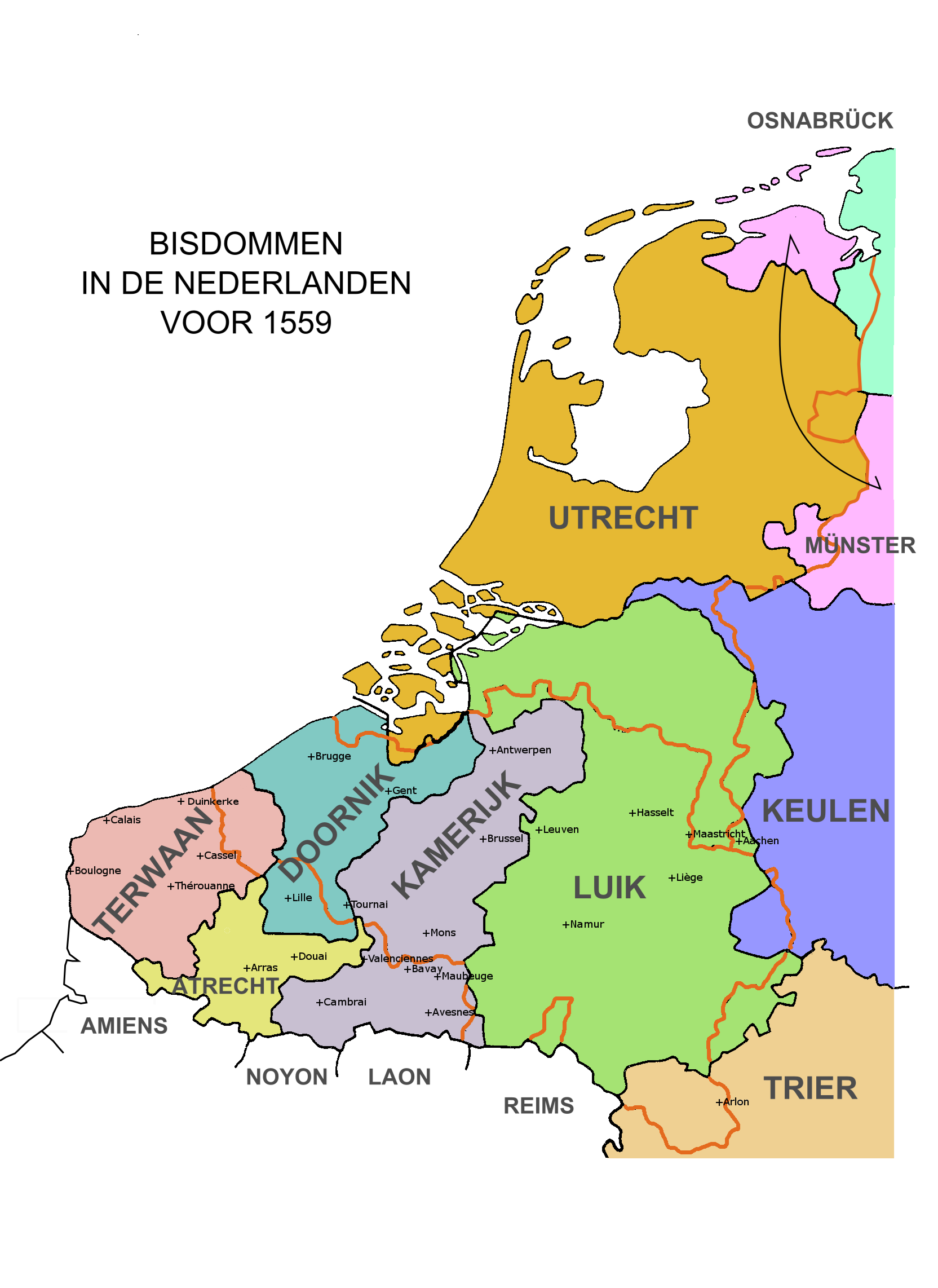
Medieval dioceses Utrecht, Thérouanne (Terwaan), Arras (Atrecht), Tournai (Doornik), Cambrai (Kamerijk) and Liège (Luik) covered most of the Low Countries, while Osnabrück, Münster, Cologne (Keulen) and Trier extended into its eastern fringes (map does not show the bishops’ temporal territories).

- List of bishops of Liège (ca. 340–1795), started in Tongeren, moved to Maastricht (6th c.), settled in Liège (ca. 722), became a secular authority in ca. 985, annexed Mechelen (ca. 11th c. until 1356), Bokhoven (1365), Loon (1366), Bouillon (1096/1456) and Horne (1568), with the Liège ecclesiastical dependency of Breust from 965, in the southern Low Countries
- List of bishops of Arras (499–580; 1094–1790), exercised temporal lordship in the episcopal city of Arras and over the nearby lordship of Marœuil, in the southwestern Low Countries
- List of bishops of Cambrai (ca. 580–1678), granted comital rights in 1007 over the Cambrésis in the southwestern Low Countries
- List of bishops of Thérouanne (ca. 639–1553), exercised temporal as well as spiritual lordship over the episcopal city of Thérouanne until its destruction in 1553, in the southwestern Low Countries
- List of bishops of Utrecht (695–1528), granted secular authority in the 10th c. (formalized in 1024) over Nedersticht (lands around Utrecht), and Oversticht or Transisalania: Salland, Twente, Vollenhove, Frisia (inc. Groningen & Ommelanden / Gorecht) and Drenthe, in the northern Low Countries. Transisalania later was rendered in Dutch as Overijssel, and comprised Salland, Twente and Volenhove only
- List of provosts of the Chapter of Saint Servatius in Maastricht (ca. 800–1797), free imperial chapter whose possessions included the Eleven banks of Saint Servatius in the eastern Low Countries
- List of abbots of Echternach (698–1795), gained status as a sovereign abbey in 973 in the southeastern Low Countries
- List of abbots of Stavelot-Malmedy (651–1795), granted secular authority in 1158 in the southern Low Countries

== Fragmentation (800–1400) ==
Middle Francia with the Low Countries in the north

=== Sovereign overlords and partitions (800–959) ===
- List of rulers of the Carolingian Empire (800–887), rulers of the unified Frankish empire before its final division and dissolution.
- List of rulers of West Francia (843–987), ruling the western part of the former empire, including the emerging County of Flanders west of the Scheldt.
- List of rulers of Lotharingia (855–959), ruling the kingdom that emerged from the northern part of the short-lived Middle Francia (843–855).
  - List of dukes of Lower Lorraine (959–1190), ruling the northern Lotharingian duchy, which covered much of the Low Countries east of the Scheldt.
- List of rulers of East Francia (843–962), whose kings absorbed Lotharingia in 925 and thereby gained overlordship over most of the Low Countries east of the Scheldt.
- List of Viking rulers in the Low Countries (ca. 840–890), including Rorik, Harald and Godfrid, who held Frankish coastal fiefs in Frisia.

=== Southwestern Low Countries ===
- List of counts of Flanders (862–1384), rulers of an increasingly autonomous county owing allegiance to the French Crown for its western territories, contesting Zeeland with the counts of Holland and acquiring the Lordship of Mechelen in 1356.
- List of counts of Hainaut (998–1433), rulers of a powerful border county, frequently bound in personal union with Flanders or Holland.
- List of counts of Artois (1180–1430), rulers of territory detached from Flanders through the marriage settlement of 1180 and the succession settlement of 1191.
- List of rulers of Tournaisis (1187–1521); formerly under Flemish influence, Tournai came under direct French royal authority in 1187 while retaining extensive communal privileges.

=== Southern and central Low Countries ===
- List of dukes and landgraves of Brabant (1183–1430), rulers of the dominant duchy in the central Low Countries, which developed from the County of Louvain and shared authority over Maastricht with the Prince-Bishopric of Liège from 1204.
  - List of counts of Louvain and Brussels (ca. 980–1183), rulers of the county from which the Duchy of Brabant developed.
  - List of rulers of the Margraviate of Antwerp (ca. 1100–1795), rulers of the frontier march along the Scheldt, which was incorporated into Brabant while the margravial title continued to be used.
  - List of lords and margraves of Bergen op Zoom (ca. 1287–1795), rulers of a lordship on the strategic border between Brabant and Holland, elevated to a margraviate in 1533.
  - List of lords of Cuijk (11th century–1795), rulers of a lordship contested by Guelders and Brabant; it was transferred to Guelders in the late 14th century and returned to Brabant during the 15th century.
  - List of counts and dukes of Limburg (1065–1430), rulers of the independent duchy until the Limburg succession dispute and the Battle of Worringen in 1288, after which John I of Brabant took possession of Limburg and was formally invested with it in 1292.
  - Rulers of Dalhem (ca. 1080–1797), rulers of a county in the Lands of Overmaas, acquired by Brabant in 1244.
  - Rulers of 's-Hertogenrade (1104–1797), rulers of a lordship in the Lands of Overmaas, acquired by Brabant following the Limburg succession conflict in 1288.
  - List of lords and drossards of Valkenburg (1041–1795), rulers and officials of a lordship in the Lands of Overmaas, acquired by Brabant between 1365 and 1378; the lordship of Wijnandsrade retained a disputed status as a free imperial lordship.
- List of abbesses of Thorn (992–1794), granted secular authority in 1292, representing more than five centuries of female territorial rule in the central-southern Low Countries.
- List of counts of Loon (ca. 1000–1366), rulers of an autonomous county in the Low Countries that was incorporated into the Prince-Bishopric of Liège in 1366 while retaining separate institutions.
- List of counts of Horne (ca. 1100–1795), rulers of an autonomous county that was governed by the prince-bishops of Liège in personal union after 1568. Its core lands included Horn, Buggenum, Haelen, Nunhem, Neer, Roggel and Heythuysen, as well as Ophoven; associated Horne lordships included Weert, Nederweert and Wessem, alongside the incorporated free villages of Geistingen, Pol en Panheel and Beegden.
- List of dukes of Bouillon and lords of Bouillon (ca. 988–1794), rulers of the castle lordship of Bouillon, which was transferred to the Prince-Bishopric of Liège in 1095–1096 and was governed by its prince-bishops as a duchy from the 15th century.
- List of counts and margraves of Namur (ca. 946–1429), rulers of the strategically situated border county along the Meuse.
- List of counts and dukes of Luxembourg (ca. 963–1795), rulers of a principality elevated from the County of Luxembourg to the Duchy of Luxembourg in 1354, which became a major territorial power on the southern border of the Low Countries.
  - List of counts of Chiny (ca. 970–1364), rulers of an Ardennes county acquired by Luxembourg in 1364.
  - List of counts of Vianden (ca. 1100–1800), rulers of a major castle-centred county in the Ardennes, which passed by inheritance to the Ottonian branch of the House of Nassau in 1417 and subsequently became associated with the House of Orange-Nassau.

=== Northern Low Countries ===
- List of counts of West Frisia and Holland (ca. 885–1432), originating with the counts of West Frisia; the name Holland came into increasing use during the 11th century, and the county subsequently expanded into Zeeland.
- Frisian Freedom (11th century–1524), the political and legal autonomy of Frisian communities that recognised no territorial count; the Seven Sealands represented a late-medieval ideal of collective Frisian unity.
- List of rulers of Saxony (ca. 860–1024), who exercised authority in parts of Frisia and the north-eastern Low Countries. The bishops of Utrecht, supported by successive (Saxon) Ottonian and Salian Frankish rulers, subsequently acquired temporal rights in the region: Vollenhove in 944, an estate in Groningen (the nucleus of the later Gorecht) in 1040, Deventer and Drenthe in 1046, northern Hamaland centred on Zutphen in 1046, Twente before 1054, and Salland in 1086. They became known collectively as Transisalania or Oversticht, in contrast to the Nedersticht around Utrecht. After 1528, the Latin name Transisalania rendered in Dutch as Overijssel and the area was narrowed to Vollenhove, Salland, and Twente.
- List of counts and dukes of Guelders (1046–1543), rulers of the dominant principality in the eastern Low Countries, elevated from a county to a duchy in 1339.
  - List of rulers of Hamaland (ca. 800–1020), rulers of an early county encompassing territories including the Veluwe and Zutphen, parts of which later contributed to the territorial formation of Guelders.
  - List of counts of Zutphen (1046–1138), rulers of the independent county, which became dynastically united with Guelders through marriage and inheritance in the 12th century.
    - List of counts van Bergh (ca. 1100–1795), rulers of the lordship centred on 's-Heerenberg, whose lords were elevated to counts in 1486.

== Consolidation (1384–1795) ==
Habsburg Netherlands

=== Burgundian and Habsburg Netherlands ===
- List of rulers of the Burgundian Netherlands (1384–1482), consolidation of Flanders and Artois (1384), Namur (1429), Brabant and Limburg (1430), Holland, Zeeland and Hainaut (1433), and Luxembourg (1443).
- List of rulers of the Habsburg Netherlands (1482–1572/1795), integration of the Lordship of Mechelen (1504), Tournaisis as the Lordship of Tournaisis (1521, captured from the French Crown), the Lordship of Frisia (1524, ending the Frisian freedom), Utrecht (1528, with the Nedersticht becoming the Lordship of Utrecht and the Oversticht becoming the Lordship of Overijssel and Lordship of Drenthe), the Lordship of Groningen (1536), and Guelders and the County of Zutphen (1543). This brought most of the Low Countries under Habsburg rule—under the Spanish Habsburgs from 1556—while most ecclesiastical territories and autonomous secular micro-states remained outside the consolidation.
  - List of governors of the Habsburg Netherlands (1501–1794), governors who administered the Habsburg Netherlands on behalf of their sovereigns, including the unified Seventeen Provinces after 1549. During the Dutch Revolt, their authority was progressively confined to the Southern Netherlands—the Spanish Netherlands until 1714 and the Austrian Netherlands until 1795—while the Northern Netherlands became the independent Dutch Republic.

=== Secular micro-states outside consolidation ===
==== Northern and central Low Countries ====
- List of counts of Buren (ca. 994–1795).
- List of counts of Culemborg (1318–1798).
- List of lords of Vianen (1318–1725).
- List of lords of IJsselstein (1279–1795).
- List of lords of Ameland (1424–1795).
- List of lords of Batenburg (ca. 1080–1795).

==== Eastern Meuse-Rhine Border ====
- List of counts of Megen (ca. 1145–1794).
- List of lords of Rimburg (1498–1794).
- List of lords and ladies of Boxmeer (1269–1797).
- List of land commanders of Alden Biesen (1366–1794), heads of the Bailiwick of Biesen of the Teutonic Order, whose subordinate lordships included Gemert from ca. 1220 and Sint-Pieters-Voeren from 1242.
- List of lords of Elsloo (1228–1789).
- List of counts of Rekem (1108–1795).
- List of lords and counts of Gronsveld (11th century–1795).
- List of lords of Terblijt (ca. 13th century–1796).
- List of lords of Mesch (1572–1796).
- List of lords of Wittem (1206–1794), including Eys from 1728 and Slenaken from 1728 to 1771.
- List of lords of Kessenich (ca. 1000–1794).
- List of lords of Stein (13th century–1795).
- List of lords of Wijlre (12th century–1795).
- List of lords of Pietersheim (11th century–1794).
- List of lords of Leut (1034–1794).
- List of lords and barons of Rijckholt (12th century–1794).
- List of rulers of Cleves (1397–1817), for the Cleves territories and enclaves in the Low Countries, including Ravenstein from 1397, Huissen, Zevenaar, Wehl, Lobith, Kekerdom, Leuth, Gennep, Mook, Ottersum, and Oeffelt.
- List of rulers of Jülich (ca. 1400–1794), for the Jülich territories and enclaves in the Low Countries, including Sittard, Born, Susteren, Tegelen, Steyl, Urmond, Eygelshoven, and the Jülich sub-lordship of Limbricht from 1665.

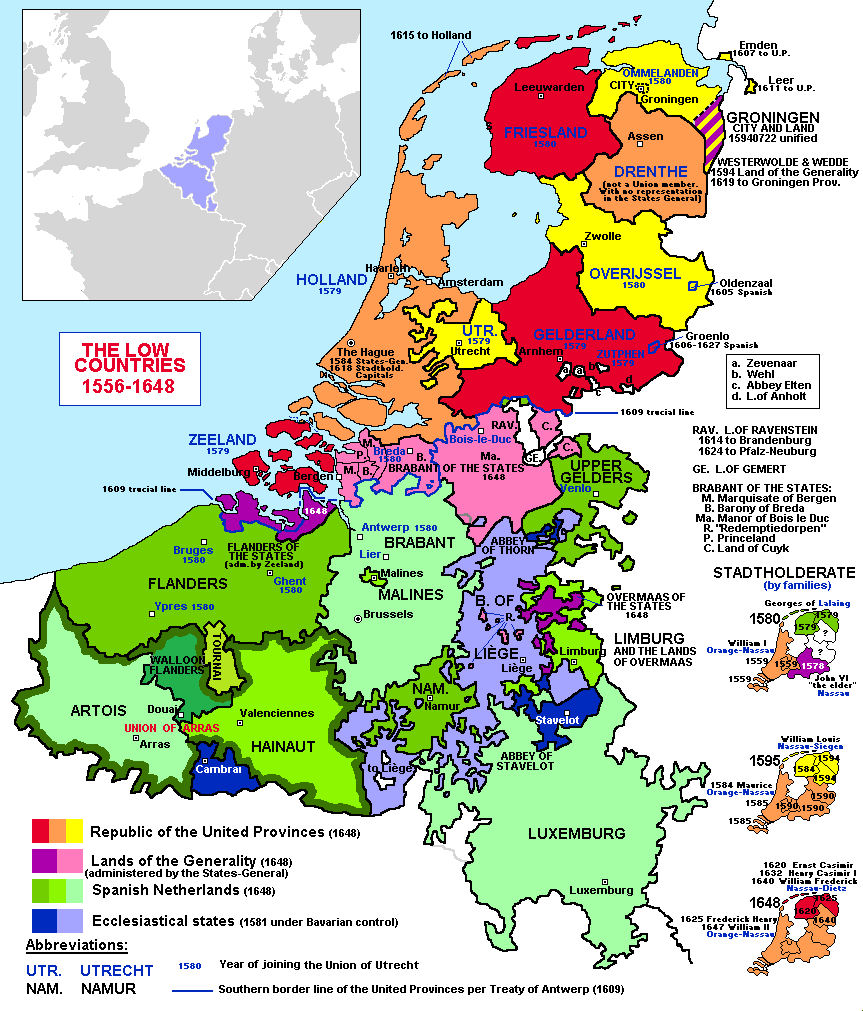
Dutch Republic, Spanish Southern Netherlands and ecclesiastical states

=== Dutch Republic ===
- List of stadtholders of Holland, Zeeland, Utrecht, Guelders and Overijssel (1572–1795). Political power was shared between the provincial states, the States General, and the stadtholders of the House of Orange-Nassau, beginning with William the Silent in Holland and Zeeland in 1572. The States General directly governed the Generality Lands of Staats-Brabant, Staats-Overmaas, Staats-Vlaanderen, and Staats-Opper-Gelre, while Guelders acquired Culemborg in 1720 and Holland acquired Vianen in 1725. (Note: During the Dutch Revolt, the Duchy of Brabant and the County of Flanders were divided between the Dutch Republic and the Spanish Habsburg Netherlands. The Peace of Münster of 1648 confirmed the Republic's possession of the conquered northern parts: Staats-Brabant, comprising most of present-day North Brabant, and Staats-Vlaanderen, broadly corresponding to present-day Zeelandic Flanders. They were governed directly by the States General as Generality Lands, while the remaining parts of Brabant and Flanders remained under Spanish rule as part of the Spanish Netherlands.)
- List of stadtholders in Friesland and Groningen under Nassau-Dietz (1578–1711), regional stadtholders from the House of Nassau-Dietz, a cadet branch of Nassau that eventually inherited the Orange title and supplied the general stadtholder in 1747.
- List of grand pensionaries in the Dutch Republic (1572–1795), leading officials of the States of Holland who, especially during stadtholderless periods, shared the direction of the Republic's government with the provincial states and the States General.

== Centralization (1789–present) ==
=== Revolts and short-lived polities ===
- List of presidents of the Sovereign Congress (1790) of the United Belgian States, established by the revolting provinces of the Austrian Netherlands during the conservative Brabant Revolution, defending traditional provincial and ecclesiastical privileges (Note: The Duchy of Luxembourg did not join the United Belgian States. The Sovereign Congress was presided over successively by François de Nélis and Henri de Crumpipen. Habsburg rule was restored in December 1790.)
- List of burgomasters of Liège (1789–1791), who served as the principal executive figures during the Republic of Liège, influenced by the French Revolution. (Note: Jean-Remy de Chestret and Jacques-Joseph Fabry served in 1789–1790, followed by Fabry and Arnold-Godefroid de Donceel in 1790–1791. They were leading officials of the city and the revolution, rather than formal heads of state of the Republic of Liège.)
- Committee of Execution of the Republic of Bouillon (1794–1795), collectively exercised executive authority over the short-lived republic, influenced by the French Revolution. (Note: The committee comprised Claude-Pierre Jobard, Remacle Poncelet, François-Gérard Pirson, Pierre Castilhon, Renéaume-Latache, Dominique Millard and Jean-Joseph Nannan. Whether the republic was formally proclaimed is disputed; some accounts describe the new body as an ad hoc Council of State exercising executive authority in the duke’s absence.)

Departments of the First French Empire in the Low Countries (1812)

=== French period ===
==== Direct French rule in the Low Countries ====
- List of presidents of the French Directory (1795–1799), held executive power over the formerly Austrian Southern Netherlands, formerly Dutch Zeelandic Flanders, and formerly autonomous territories, including Liège, Stavelot-Malmedy, Bouillon, and numerous microstates and enclaves in the eastern Meuse–Rhine borderlands. Following their annexation by the French First Republic in 1795, these lands were reorganized into French departments whose boundaries deliberately replaced and crossed those of the former duchies, counties, lordships and ecclesiastical territories. (Note: The nine principal departments created were Deux-Nèthes, Dyle, Escaut, Forêts, Jemappes, Lys, Meuse-Inférieure, Ourthe and Sambre-et-Meuse. Zeelandic Flanders, formerly Staats-Vlaanderen, was ceded by the Batavian Republic to France under the Treaty of The Hague of 1795 and incorporated into the department of Escaut. The annexed eastern border Meuse–Rhine microstates were incorporated into the Department of Meuse-Inférieure and included the former autonomous lordships and counties of Rekem, Gronsveld, Wittem, Kessenich, Stein, Wijlre, Pietersheim, Leut, Rijckholt, Rimburg, Terblijt, Mesch and Elsloo. The left-bank territories of the duchies of Jülich and Cleves, including several of their possessions in the Meuse–Rhine borderlands, were organized chiefly as the Department of Roer in 1798.)
- List of consuls of the French Consulate (1799–1804), held executive power over the same annexed territories as French departments of the French First Republic
- List of rulers of the First French Empire (1804–1814), held sovereignty under Napoleon I over the French-annexed territories of the Low Countries, organized as departments of the First French Empire. Direct French rule expanded in 1807 to include Vlissingen, Lommel and the southern part of Eersel, ceded by the Kingdom of Holland, and in 1810 through the kingdom’s two-stage annexation: Dutch Brabant, the remaining Dutch-held parts of Zeeland, including Schouwen, and the part of Gelderland on the left bank of the Waal were ceded in March, followed by the incorporation of the remainder of the kingdom in July. The annexed northern territories were subsequently reorganized into French departments, largely retaining the administrative framework of the Kingdom of Holland but introducing predominantly geographical names. (Note: The territories ceded in March 1810 were divided among Bouches-de-l'Escaut, comprising the remaining Dutch-held part of Zeeland; Bouches-du-Rhin, comprising eastern North Brabant and the part of Gelderland south of the Waal; and the existing department of Deux-Nèthes, to which western North Brabant, including the arrondissement of Breda, was added. The remainder of the former Kingdom of Holland was divided from 1 January 1811 into Zuyderzée, combining Amstelland and Utrecht; Bouches-de-la-Meuse, corresponding to the former department of Maasland; Yssel-Supérieur, comprising most of Gelderland north of the Waal; Bouches-de-l'Yssel, corresponding mainly to Overijssel; Frise, corresponding mainly to Friesland; Ems-Occidental, combining Groningen and Drenthe; and Ems-Oriental, comprising East Frisia. Zeelandic Flanders was excluded from Bouches-de-l’Escaut because it had already formed part of the Department of Escaut since 1795.) Of the remaining Dutch overseas possessions, Java became a French colony, while the Guinea Coast forts remained locally Dutch-administered under French authority without being occupied by France. (Note: Most other former Batavian and Holland colonies were already under British occupation by 1810; Britain conquered Java in 1811.)

==== Successive French client states in the northern Low Countries ====
- List of presidents of the National Assembly of the Batavian Republic (1796–1798), rotating heads of state in the Batavian Republic, the successor state to the Dutch Republic, which absorbed the former autonomous lordships and counties of Buren and Batenburg during the abolition of the old provincial, feudal and seigneurial order. The new republic inherited the state-administered overseas possessions of the former Dutch Republic and brought the administration of the Dutch East India Company under Batavian state control. (Note: The possessions formerly administered by the Dutch West India Company had reverted to the States General in 1792 and passed to the Batavian Republic in 1795. On 24 December 1795, the VOC directors were replaced by the state-appointed Committee for East Indian Trade and Possessions.)
- List of members of the Uitvoerend Bewind (1798–1801), held collective executive power in the Batavian Republic, during which the Dutch East India Company was formally dissolved in 1799 and its remaining possessions, establishments, administration and debts passed to the Batavian state. Under the Staatsregeling of 1798, the unitary republic was divided into eight new departments, named mainly after rivers and deliberately drawn across the boundaries of the former historic provinces; their precise boundaries were established in 1799. During this period, former autonomous territories including Megen, Boxmeer, Gemert and Ravenstein were transferred to the Batavian Republic in 1800. (Note: The eight departments were Ems, Old IJssel, Rhine, Amstel, Texel, Delf, Dommel and Scheldt and Meuse. Although named in the Staatsregeling of 1798, their detailed territorial boundaries took effect under the law of 30 March 1799.)
- List of members of the Staatsbewind (1801–1805), served as heads of state over the Batavian Commonwealth following a French-backed coup, during which IJsselstein was incorporated into the Batavian Republic in 1802 and Ameland in 1801. Under the Staatsregeling of 1801, the river-named departments created in 1798 were replaced by eight departments based on the names and boundaries of the historic provinces. (Note: The departments were Bataafs Brabant, Friesland, Gelderland, Holland, Overijssel, Stad en Landen van Groningen, Utrecht and Zeeland. Drenthe remained united with Overijssel; Ameland was assigned to Friesland; Wedde and Westerwolde to Groningen; IJsselstein to Holland; Vianen to Utrecht; and Culemborg and Buren to Gelderland.)
- List of grand pensionaries in the Batavian Republic (1805–1806), held executive power over the Batavian Republic, during which Drenthe was separated from Overijssel and restored as a separate ninth department in August 1805.
- List of kings of Holland (1806–1810), French puppet kingdom ruled by Napoleon’s brother Louis, reorganized in 1807 into ten departments largely based on the former provincial framework, with the former department of Holland divided into Amstelland and Maasland. The kingdom expanded in 1807–1808 with East Frisia, Jever and former Cleves territories in Gelderland, while also undergoing border exchanges with France. (Note: Under the Treaty of Fontainebleau of 11 November 1807, Holland acquired East Frisia and Jever, which were incorporated in 1808 as the eleventh department of East Frisia, while the lordships of Kniphausen and Varel were placed under Holland’s sovereignty; Varel was subsequently restored to Oldenburg. The former Cleves territories taken into possession in 1808 comprised Zevenaar and the Ambt Liemers, Huissen, Malburgen and Hulhuizen. Holland also received the northern part of Luyksgestel, while ceding Vlissingen and its surrounding territory, Lommel and the southern part of Eersel to France.) The kingdom also inherited the Batavian Republic’s remaining overseas possessions and colonial administrations, including the East Indian possessions centred on Java and the establishments on the Guinea Coast. (Note: Several other former Dutch colonies were already under British occupation. The administration of the Guinea Coast was reorganized under Louis Bonaparte in 1807 and 1809. Following the annexation of the Kingdom of Holland in 1810, the remaining overseas possessions came under French imperial authority.)

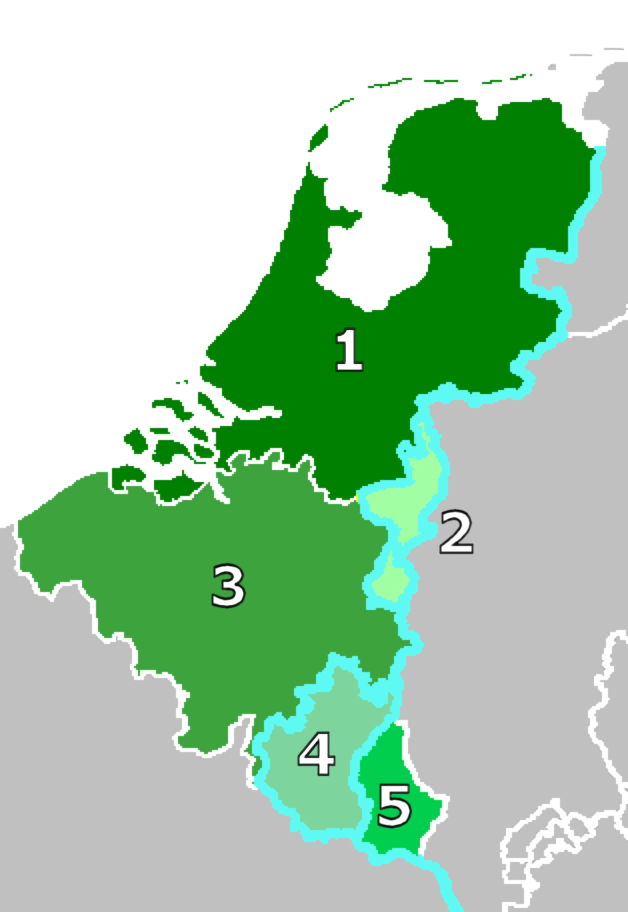
1815: Netherlands 1-3 in personal union with Luxembourg 4-5. 1831: Netherlands 1-2; Belgium 3-5. 1839: Netherlands 1 in personal union with Limburg and Luxembourg 2-5; Belgium 3-4. 1866: Netherlands 1-2 in personal union with Luxembourg 5; Belgium 3-4. 1890: Netherlands 1-2; Belgium 3-4; Luxembourg 5.

=== Kingdom of the Netherlands ===
- List of monarchs of the Netherlands (1813–present), covering the hereditary rulers of the Sovereign Principality of the United Netherlands (1813–1815) and subsequently the United Kingdom of the Netherlands (1815–1839). Under the Constitution of 1814, the formerly French departments in the Northern Low Countries were reversed and replaced by the nine historic pre-revolutionary provinces. (Note: Utrecht and Drenthe were restored as separate provinces, and the province of Holland was reunited. The Constitution of 1814 listed Gelderland, Holland, Zeeland, Utrecht, Friesland, Overijssel, Groningen, Brabant and Drenthe as the nine provinces, which were to retain their old boundaries, subject to specified territorial adjustments.) The United Kingdom was established and its external borders broadly determined by the Congress of Vienna (1814–1815), with former Cleves territories in Gelderland and former Jülich territories in Limburg incorporated through the post-Napoleonic border settlements of 1815–1817. Under the Constitution of 1815, the former French departments in the Southern Low Countries received historical provincial names while their French departmental boundaries were largely retained. (Note: South Brabant retained the boundaries of the former Department of Dyle, East Flanders those of Escaut, West Flanders those of Lys, Hainaut those of Jemappes, and Antwerp those of Deux-Nèthes. Limburg comprised the whole of Meuse-Inférieure together with the parts of Roer assigned to the kingdom by the Vienna settlement; Liège comprised Ourthe minus the territories excluded by that settlement, while Namur comprised the part of Sambre-et-Meuse not assigned to the Grand Duchy of Luxembourg. Most of the former Forêts department became part of Luxembourg, which was held by the Dutch monarch in personal union and belonged to the German Confederation.) (Note: The former Cleves territories transferred to the Netherlands in 1816 included Huissen, Malburgen, Zevenaar, Duiven and Wehl; Lobith, Hulhuizen, Kekerdom and Leuth followed in 1817, while Schenkenschanz passed to Prussia. Parts of former Jülich territory west of the newly established frontier were incorporated into Limburg. Under the Dutch–Prussian boundary settlement of 1816, the disputed district of Moresnet was divided between the two states: Moresnet was assigned to the Netherlands, Neu-Moresnet to Prussia, while the zinc-mining territory around Kelmis became Neutral Moresnet, administered jointly by the Netherlands and Prussia and, after the Belgian secession, by Belgium and Prussia. East Frisia, although part of the Kingdom of Holland from 1807 to 1810, was not restored to Dutch sovereignty and was transferred by Prussia to Hanover in 1815. The Dutch–Prussian frontier was further delimited by the Treaty of Aachen and the Treaty of Cleves in 1816.) Following the secession of Belgium in 1830 and its recognition in 1839, the reduced Kingdom of the Netherlands (1839–present) came to be. Under the Treaty of London (1839), the Netherlands retained the part of the former province of Limburg that forms the present-day Dutch province, while the western part became Belgian Limburg. The Dutch monarch retained the reduced Grand Duchy of Luxembourg, while its western part became the Belgian province of Luxembourg. The resulting border with Belgium was subsequently delimited under the boundary settlement concluded at The Hague in 1842 and the Convention of Maastricht of 1843, including the parcel-based enclave arrangement at Baarle-Hertog and Baarle-Nassau. Following the Second World War, several German border areas were placed under provisional Dutch administration in 1949 as post-war border corrections. Most were returned to West Germany on 1 August 1963 under the Dutch–German settlement concluded in 1960. (Note: The approximately 69 km² placed under Dutch administration on 23 April 1949 included Elten, the Selfkant around Tüddern, Suderwick-West and several smaller border strips. Almost all were returned in 1963, while the Duivelsberg or Wylerberg remained part of the Netherlands.) The monarchs also reigned over the overseas territories of the Dutch East Indies (1816–1949), Netherlands New Guinea (1949–1962), the Dutch possessions on the Guinea Coast (1815–1872), Suriname (1816–1975), and the Dutch Caribbean territories, restored to Dutch rule in 1816 and subsequently governed as Curaçao and Dependencies and the Netherlands Antilles, followed by Aruba (1986–present), Curaçao (2010–present) and Sint Maarten (2010–present), which together with the Netherlands constitute the four countries of the Kingdom under the constitutional framework established by the Charter for the Kingdom of the Netherlands in 1954 to replace the former colonial relationship. The Charter originally comprised the Netherlands, Suriname and the Netherlands Antilles. The Caribbean Netherlands—Bonaire, Sint Eustatius and Saba—have been special municipalities of the Netherlands since 2010.
  - List of counts and dukes of Limburg (1839–1866), the Dutch monarchs in their capacity as dukes of the part of the Dutch province of Limburg admitted to the German Confederation following the partition of Limburg under the Treaty of London (1839). This federal status compensated the German Confederation for the loss of the Belgian part of Luxembourg, while Maastricht and Venlo remained outside the Confederation. The special status ended with the dissolution of the German Confederation in 1866, after which Limburg continued solely as a province of the Netherlands. (Note: The nineteenth-century duchy should not be confused with the medieval Duchy of Limburg. The Dutch province of Limburg had already been established in 1815; its admission to the German Confederation in 1839 did not constitute a new territorial incorporation of the former Meuse–Rhine lordships.)
  - List of governors-general of the Dutch East Indies (1610–1949), highest Dutch colonial administrators in the East Indies, first under the VOC and after 1800 under the Dutch state, representing Dutch authority until Indonesian independence
  - List of colonial governors of the Dutch Gold Coast (1612–1872), heads of the Dutch administration on the Guinea Coast, initially under the Dutch West India Company and later under successive Dutch state governments. The establishments remained under locally Dutch administration during the French annexation and subsequently represented the restored Kingdom of the Netherlands until their transfer to the United Kingdom in 1872.
  - List of colonial governors of Suriname (1667–1975), colonial administrators of Suriname under Dutch rule, later representing the Kingdom of the Netherlands until Surinamese independence
  - List of governors of Curaçao and Dependencies (1845–1954), colonial governors of the Dutch Caribbean colony of Curaçao and Dependencies, predecessor of the Netherlands Antilles
  - List of governors of the Netherlands Antilles (1954–2010), representatives of the Dutch monarch in the Netherlands Antilles, a constituent country of the Kingdom of the Netherlands
  - List of governors of Curaçao (2010–present), representatives of the Dutch monarch in Curaçao, a constituent country of the Kingdom of the Netherlands
  - List of governors of Aruba (1986–present), representatives of the Dutch monarch in Aruba, a constituent country of the Kingdom of the Netherlands following its status aparte
  - List of governors of Sint Maarten (2010–present), representatives of the Dutch monarch in Sint Maarten, a constituent country of the Kingdom of the Netherlands
- List of prime ministers of the Netherlands (1848–present), since the constitutional reform of 1848, ministers have borne political responsibility for government acts, while the prime minister chairs the Council of Ministers.

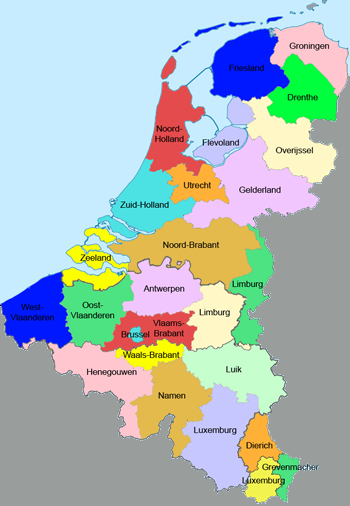
Provinces within present-day the Netherlands, Belgium and Luxembourg.

=== Kingdom of Belgium ===
- List of monarchs of Belgium (1831–present), the constitutional monarchs of the Kingdom of Belgium, established following the Belgian Revolution of 1830 and internationally recognized under the Treaty of London (1839). The settlement of 1839 partitioned the former province of Limburg between Belgium and the Netherlands. It also divided the Grand Duchy of Luxembourg: its western part became the Belgian province of Luxembourg, while the remaining grand duchy continued under the Dutch monarch. The resulting Belgian–Dutch frontier was subsequently delimited under the boundary settlement concluded at The Hague in 1842 and the Convention of Maastricht of 1843. (Note: In the Baarle area, where no continuous boundary could be established, the convention recorded the Belgian or Dutch nationality of individual cadastral parcels, thereby preserving the enclaves of Baarle-Hertog and the Dutch counter-enclaves of Baarle-Nassau.) Belgium also succeeded the Netherlands as the joint administrator with Prussia of Neutral Moresnet, which, together with Eupen-Malmedy and part of Prussian Moresnet, was incorporated into Belgium following the Treaty of Versailles in 1920. Leopold II also held personal sovereignty over the Congo Free State (1885–1908), which was constitutionally distinct from Belgium. Following its annexation by Belgium in 1908, the Belgian monarchs reigned over the Belgian Congo until its independence in 1960. Belgium also administered Ruanda-Urundi following its military occupation in 1916, subsequently as a League of Nations mandate and a United Nations trust territory, until the independence of Rwanda and Burundi in 1962.
  - List of governors-general of the Congo Free State (1885–1908), colonial administrators of the Congo Free State under the personal sovereignty of Leopold II
  - List of governors-general of the Belgian Congo (1908–1960), colonial administrators of the Belgian Congo after its annexation by Belgium, until Congolese independence
  - List of governors of Ruanda-Urundi (1916/1924–1962), Belgian colonial administrators of Ruanda-Urundi, first under military occupation and later as a League of Nations mandate and United Nations trust territory, until the independence of Rwanda and Burundi
- List of prime ministers of Belgium (1831–present), under the Belgian Constitution, the monarch is inviolable, ministers are accountable, and no act of the monarch can take effect without ministerial countersignature.

=== Grand Duchy of Luxembourg ===
- List of monarchs of Luxembourg (1815–present), the grand dukes of the Grand Duchy of Luxembourg, initially the Dutch monarchs in personal union with the Netherlands (1815–1890), followed by a separate Luxembourgish dynasty from 1890. Established by the Congress of Vienna in 1815, the grand duchy lost its territories in the Eifel and east of the Moselle, Sûre and Our to Prussia, and became a member of the German Confederation, with a Prussian garrison stationed in the federal fortress of Luxembourg. (Note: Under the Treaty of London (1839), the western part of the grand duchy became the Belgian province of Luxembourg, while the remaining territory continued as the Grand Duchy of Luxembourg under the Dutch monarch. The Treaty of London (1867) established Luxembourg’s permanent neutrality, required the withdrawal of the Prussian garrison and the dismantling of the fortress. The personal union with the Netherlands ended in 1890 following the death of William III, when the grand-ducal crown passed to Adolphe of Nassau-Weilburg.)
- List of prime ministers of Luxembourg (1848–present), since the Constitution of 1848, Luxembourg has developed as a parliamentary constitutional monarchy, with governmental responsibility resting with ministers rather than the monarch personally.

== See also ==
- List of heirs to the Dutch throne
- List of counts of East Frisia
