= Treaty of Fontainebleau =

Treaty of Fontainebleau may refer to:

- Treaty of Fontainebleau (1541), a treaty between Denmark–Norway and France
- Treaty of Fontainebleau (1631), a treaty between Bavaria and France during the Thirty Years' War
- Treaty of Fontainebleau (1661), a treaty between France and the Swedish Empire for support of the French choice for King of Poland
- Treaty of Fontainebleau (1679), a treaty between Denmark–Norway and Sweden during the Scanian War
- Treaty of Fontainebleau (1743), a treaty between France and Spain that established the second Bourbon Family Compact
- Treaty of Fontainebleau (1745), a between France and England that established a military alliance
- Treaty of Fontainebleau (1762), an agreement between France and Spain that ceded the colony of Louisiana to Spain
- Treaty of Fontainebleau (1785), a treaty between the Dutch Republic and the Holy Roman Empire regarding the Scheldt Estuary
- Treaty of Fontainebleau (October 10, 1807), a treaty between France and Austria regulating several border issues that were unresolved since the Treaty of Pressburg (1805)
- Treaty of Fontainebleau (October 1807), a treaty between Spain and France about the occupation of Portugal, signed October 27
- Treaty of Fontainebleau (October 1807) between France and Denmark-Norway
- Treaty of Fontainebleau (November 1807), a treaty between France and the Kingdom of Holland in which France annexed Flushing, and Holland received East Frisia in compensation
- Treaty of Fontainebleau (1814), a treaty that exiled Napoleon Bonaparte as the Emperor of Elba

== See also ==
- Edict of Fontainebleau (1685), the Revocation of the Edict of Nantes
