= List of Viking rulers in the Low Countries =

List of Norse chieftains who held fiefdoms in Frisia and the Low Countries

The list of Viking rulers in the Low Countries encompasses Norse chieftains who successfully established formal territorial lordship, or fiefdoms, over parts of Frisia in the Low Countries (primarily the modern-day Netherlands and Belgium) between roughly 840 and 892 AD.

Unlike the destructive hit-and-run raiders of the era, these leaders were granted lands by Carolingian emperors Lothair I and Charles the Fat. In exchange, they converted to Christianity, swore oaths of fealty, and acted as a buffer defense to protect the northern borders against other Viking incursions.

== List of rulers (ca. 840–892 AD) ==
Ruler	Reign	Dominions & Seats	Carolingian Suzerain	Fate & Legacy
Harald Klak (and brother Rorik)	ca. 841–850 AD	Walcheren and the islands of Zeeland	Lothair I	Granted the island of Walcheren as a benefice. Harald's rule established the first stable Norse foothold in the Low Countries.
Rorik of Dorestad	ca. 850–875 AD	Kennemerland and the emporium of Dorestad	Lothair I / Louis the German	The most powerful and long-lasting Norse ruler in the region. He controlled the vital trading port of Dorestad and much of the northern Netherlands until his death.
Godfrid, Duke of Frisia	ca. 882–885 AD	Frisia and the region of the Rhine–Meuse–Scheldt delta	Charles the Fat	Granted Rorik's former lands and the title of Duke (Dux) after a major raid on the Rhineland. He was assassinated by a coalition of Saxon and Frankish nobles in 885 AD.
Sigfred & Gottfried	ca. 885–892 AD	Asselt (Limburg) and the Meuse river valley	Charles the Fat / Arnulf of Carinthia	Led the Great Heathen Army into the southern Low Countries. They established fortified winter camps along the Meuse and Dyle rivers before being defeated and driven out.

== Aftermath ==
The reliance on Danish rulers ultimately proved unstable for the Carolingian monarchs, as leaders like Godfrid often used their territory as a base to demand more land and silver. Following the assassination of Godfrid in 885, the period of Norse lordship ended in the early 890s following the decisive defeat of the Vikings at the Battle of Leuven (891 AD). The local Frisian and Frankish nobility—most notably the early Counts of Holland and Flanders—filled the power vacuum, successfully taking over the defense of the Low Countries themselves.

== See also ==
- Frisian–Frankish wars
- Duchy of Frisia
- Lists of rulers in the Low Countries
