= Fontainebleau (disambiguation) =

Fontainebleau is a commune in the metropolitan area of Paris.

Fontainebleau may also refer to:

== Art and music ==
- Fontainebleau (album), a 1956 jazz album by Tadd Dameron
- Fontainebleau Schools, French music and art schools
- School of Fontainebleau, two periods of late Renaissance French art

== Places ==
- Fontainebleau, a village amalgamated into the municipality of Weedon, Quebec, Canada
- Forest of Fontainebleau
- Arrondissement of Fontainebleau
- Fontainebleau, Gauteng, South Africa, a suburb of Johannesburg
- Fontainebleau, Florida, U.S., a census-designated place
- Fountainbleau, Missouri, U.S., an unincorporated community
- Fontainebleau, New Orleans, Louisiana, U.S., a neighborhood of New Orleans
- Fontainebleau State Park, Louisiana, U.S

== Business ==
- Fontainebleau Resorts, a U.S. resort-hotel company, or one of its two properties:
  - Fontainebleau Miami Beach
  - Fontainebleau Las Vegas

== Other uses ==
- Palace of Fontainebleau, one of the largest French royal châteaux
- Fontainebleau, a dessert based on whipped cream

== See also ==
- Fontainebleau Agreements, a proposed arrangement between the France and the Vietminh at the outbreak of the First Indochina War
- Treaty of Fontainebleau (disambiguation), a list of all the treaties signed at Fontainebleau
