= Leuth, Netherlands =

Leuth
- Village
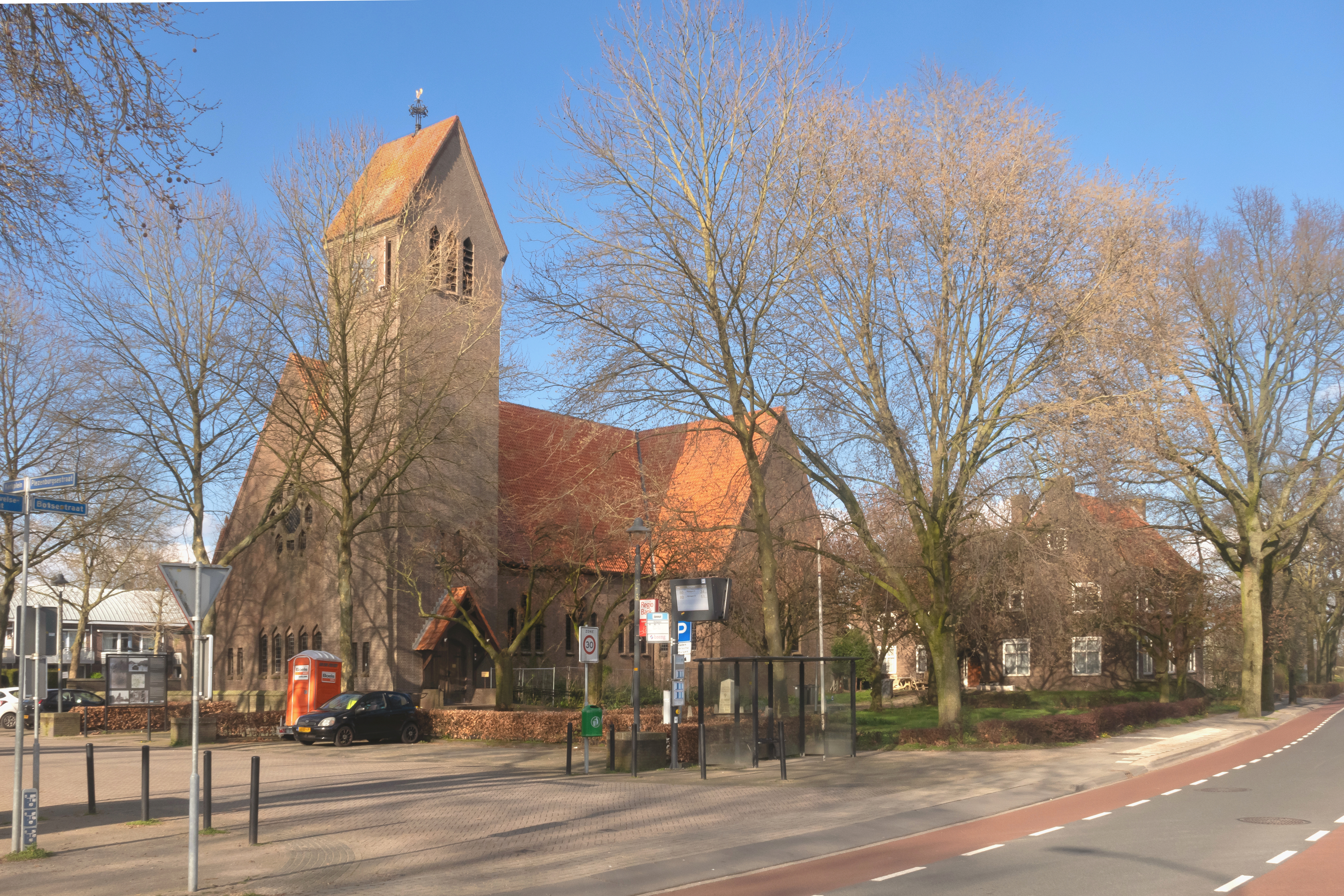
- Remigiuskerk van Leuth
- Interactive map of Leuth
- Coordinates: 51°50′18″N 5°59′34″E
- Country: Netherlands
- Province: Gelderland
- Municipality: Berg en Dal

Area
  - Total: 4.11 km^{2} (1.59 sq mi)

Population (2007)
  - Total: 1,810

Leuth (Dutch pronunciation: [løːt]) is a village in the Dutch province of Gelderland. It is located in the municipality of Berg en Dal, about 10 km east of Nijmegen.

Leuth was founded on a sandbank in the floodplain marshes north of the river Waal. The earliest mention of the settlement, named Lotde, dates back to 891 and 892. The village belonged until 1815 to Prussia; Leuth was a separate municipality until about 1814. It became a part of the Prussian municipality Niel, until it was transferred back to the Netherlands in 1817, as a part of the municipality of Ooij en Persingen, which later has become a part of the municipality of Ubbergen.

During the second war world Leuth was severely affected. The centre of the original village was almost entirely destroyed.

The village has a small shopping centre and a primary school.

== Monuments ==
- The Roman Catholic Church of Leuth, dedicated to Saint Remigius of Reims, dates from 1934/35 and was designed by H.C. van de Leur. After the second world war, the church was restored.
- Another remarkable building in the village is the former steam dairy De Duffelt, whose chimney has been preserved.
- Two farms with their barns are Rijksmonument, national historical monument.
- The two war memorials commemorating the fallen soldiers from Leuth resp. the civilian victims of World War II.
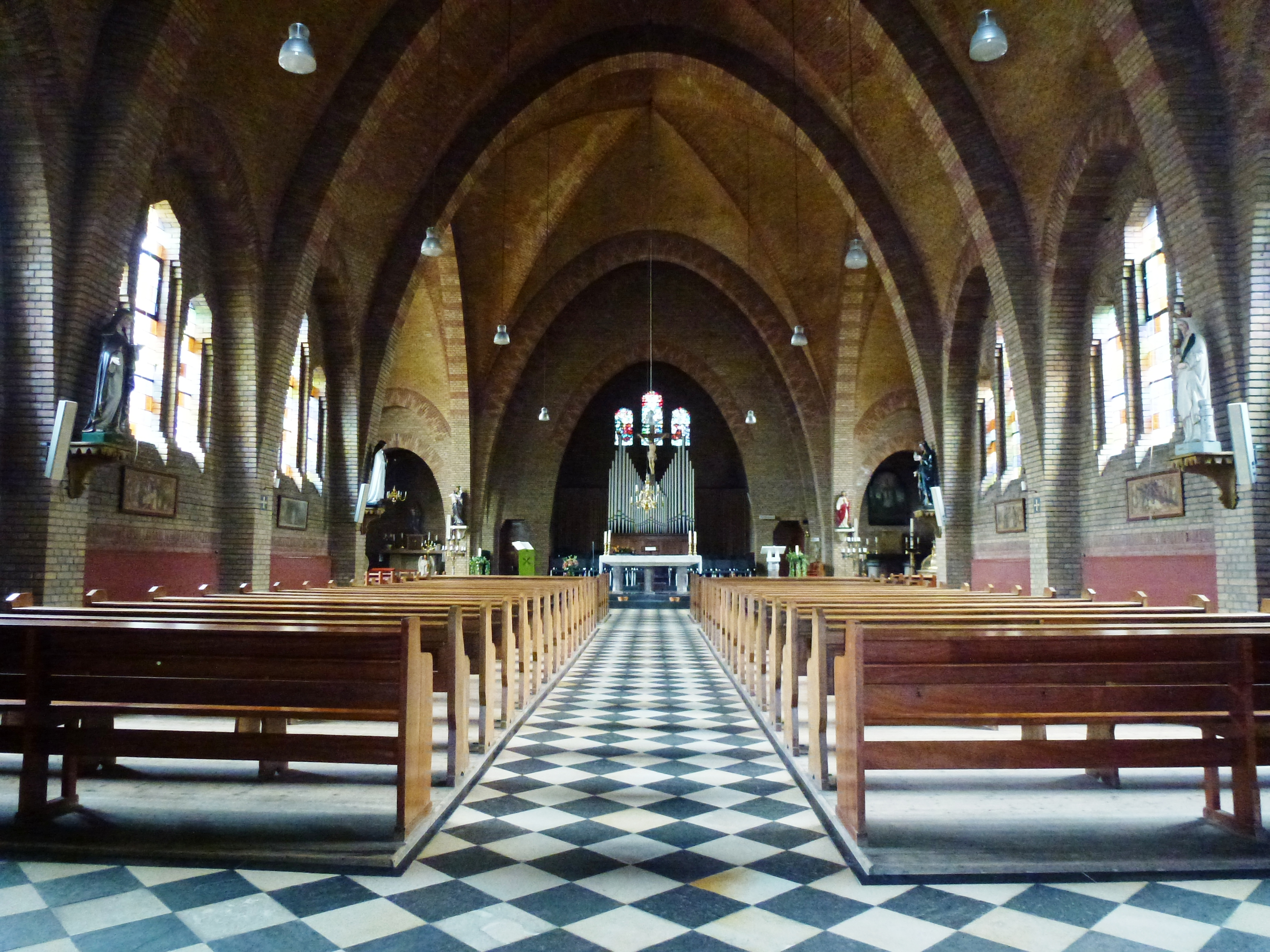
Remigius church, interior

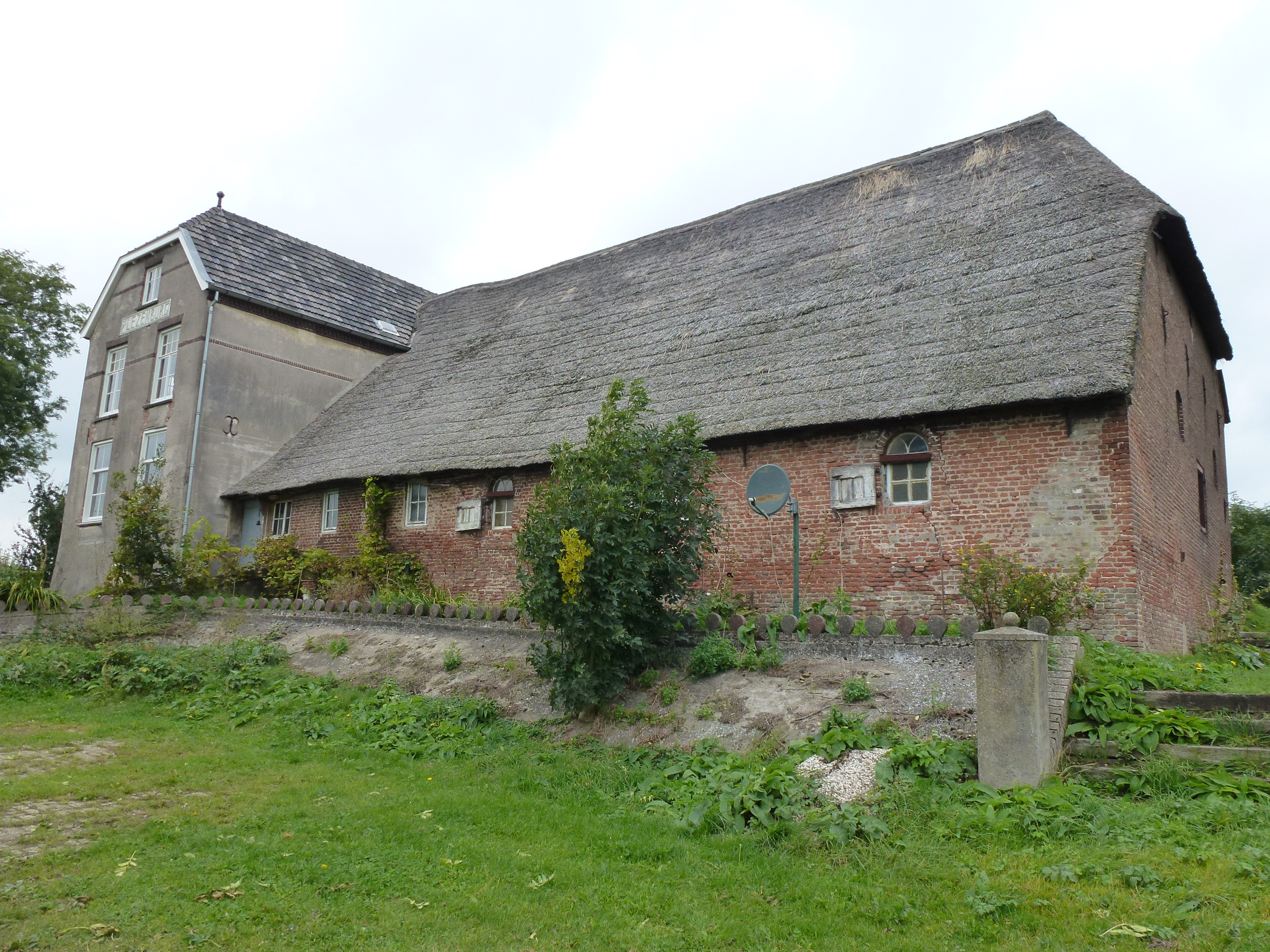
Farm Plezenburg

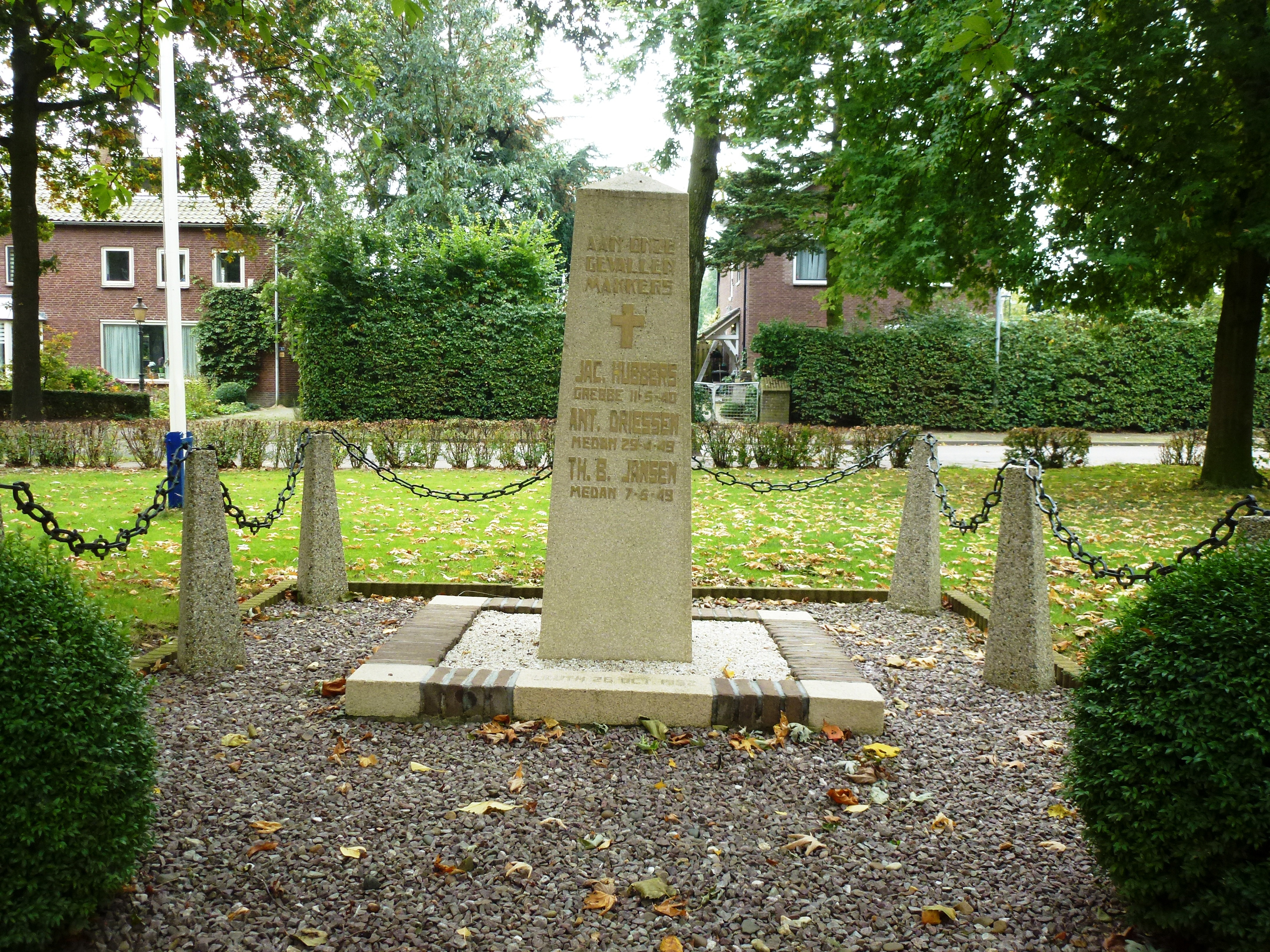
Military war memorial

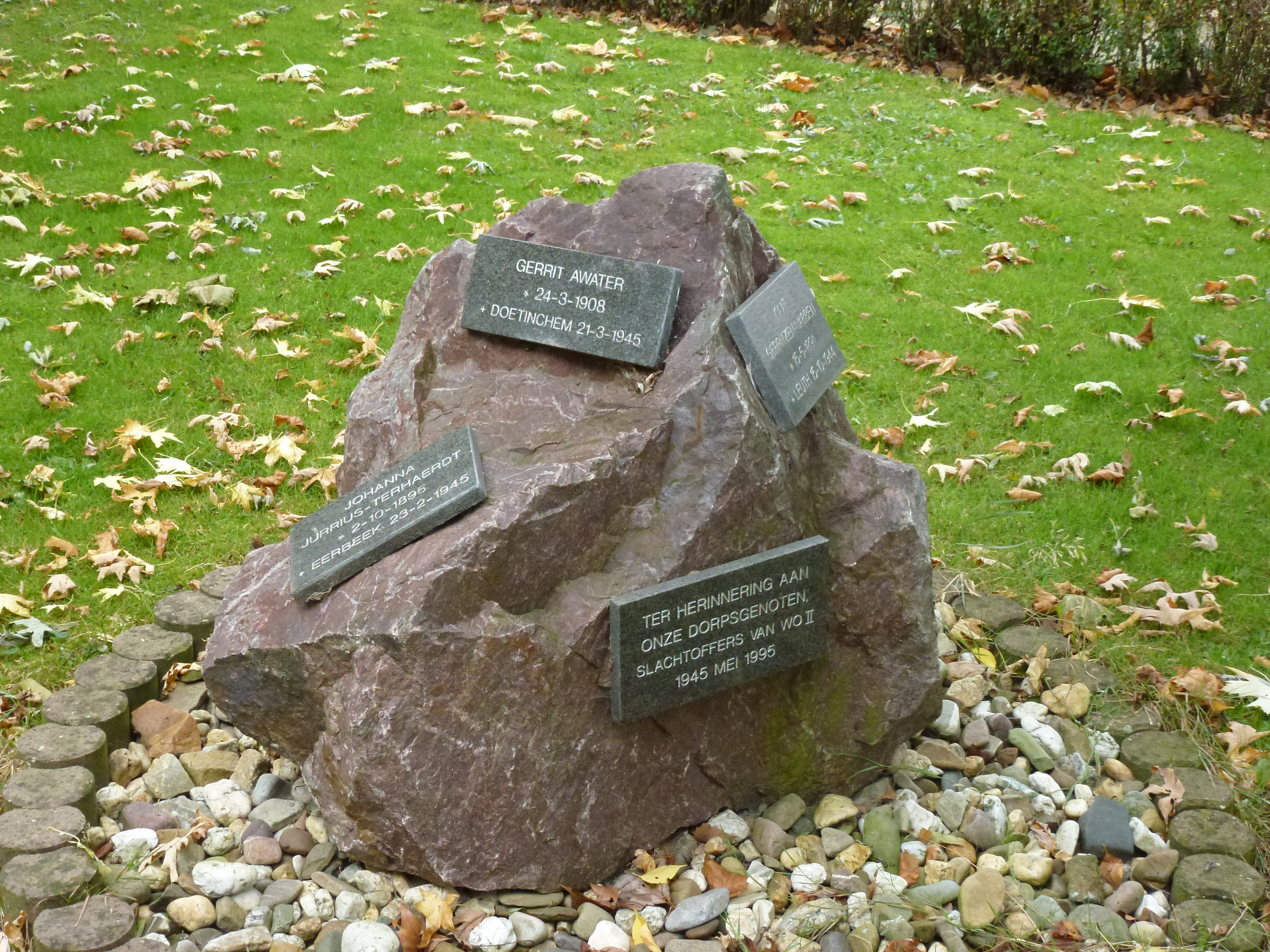
Civil war memorial
