= Treaty of Fontainebleau (1541) =

Treaty between the Kingdom of France and Denmark-Norway, 1541

Alliance treaty between the Kingdom of France and the Kingdom of Denmark and Norway
- Context: The French and Danish kingdoms sign a treaty of alliance
- Signed: 29 November 1541
- Location: Fontainebleau
- Signatories: (Denmark–Norway) Christian III (Kingdom of France) Francis I
- Parties: Denmark–Norway; Kingdom of France
- Language: French

The Treaty of Fontainebleau of 1541 was a treaty of alliance between Denmark–Norway and the Kingdom of France in 1541. The alliance was rewritten in June 1542, and formally ended in 1544 by the Treaty of Speyer, between Denmark-Norway and the Holy Roman Empire.

== Background ==
Monarchs

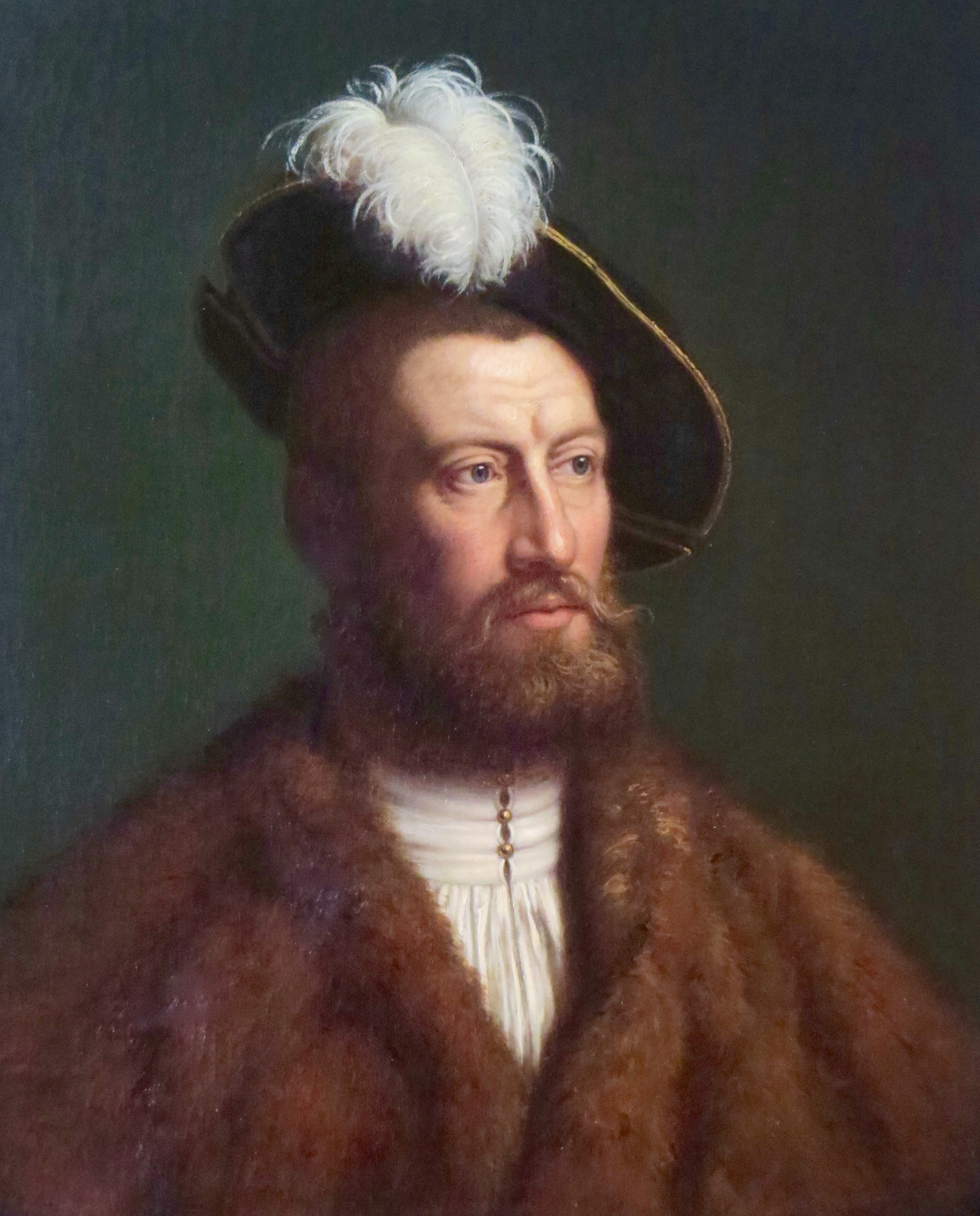
Christian III, King of Denmark and Norway and more... (r.1534-1559)

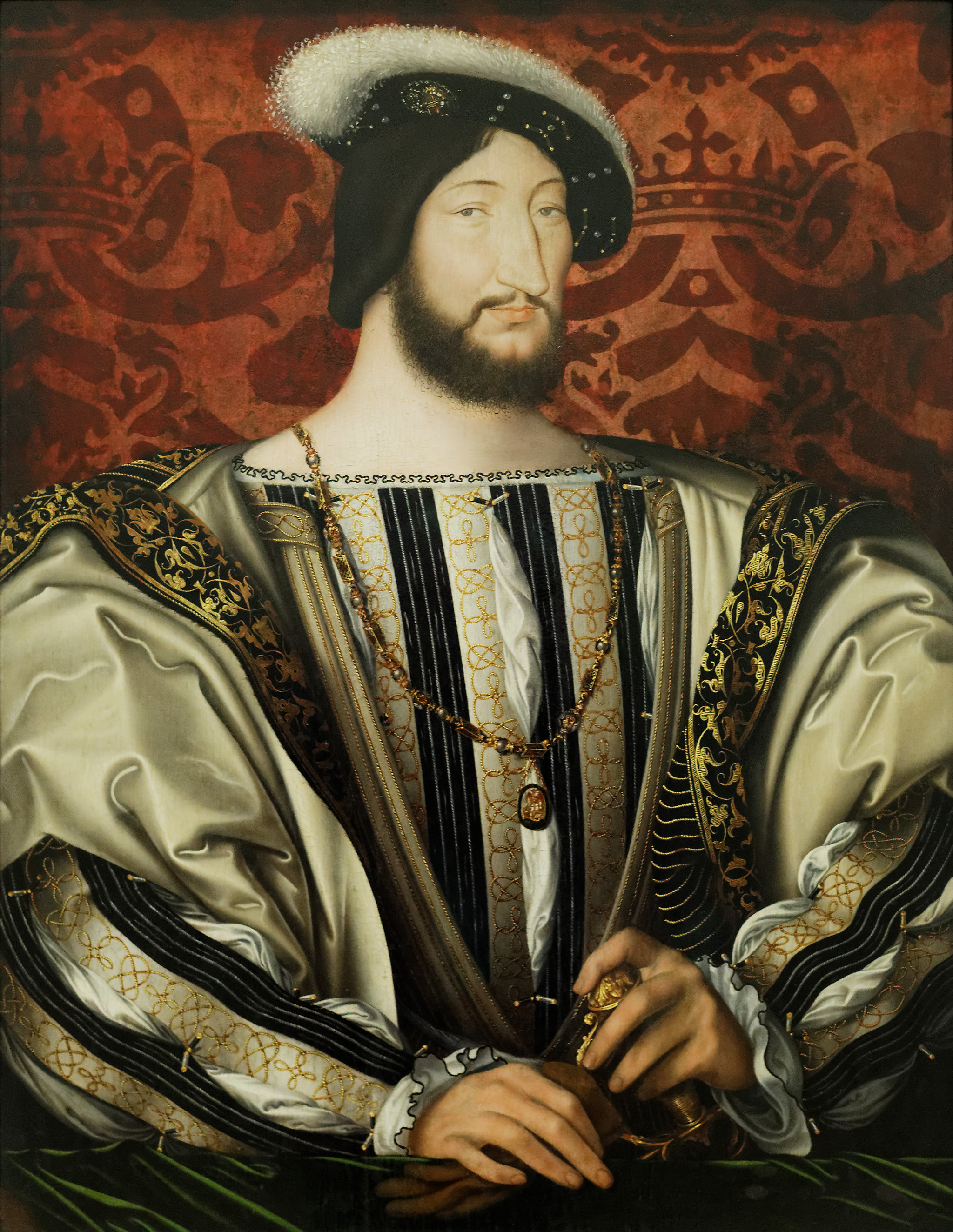
Francis I, King of France (r.1525-1547)

In 1534 Protestant duke Christian of Schleswig-Holstein would be elected king of Denmark as king Christian III. Because a rise of religious tensions in Denmark, Christian would have to face a full-out Civil war, known as the Count's Feud. Christian would eventually win the feud and convert Denmark to Protestantism.

During the conflict, Charles V, Holy Roman Emperor, had supported the Catholic contender and former king to the throne, Christian II of Denmark. Charles had also supported the contender for Norway, Frederick of Wittelsbach, in opposition to Christian III of Denmark-Norway. This, along with religious tensions naturally made Charles V and Christian III enemies, and in 1541 Christian would seek alliance with Charles enemy, Francis I of France.

== Stipulations ==
On 29 November 1541, Christian and Francis concluded the Treaty of Fontainebleau. In accordance with the treaty, the stipulations were as follows:

- Both promising mutual assistance in case of attack of a foreign enemy
- Denmark-Norway guaranteed the closure of the Sound to France's enemies
- In case of necessity, Denmark-Norway would place 1000 men and six vessels at the disposal of France within three months
- In case of necessity, France would place 2000 men and 12 vessels within four months

== Treaty in effect ==
In 1542 war was declared between the Holy Roman Empire and France, starting the Italian War of 1542–1546. In accordinance with the treaty, Denmark declared war on Charles V. A Danish contingent joined the Franco-Cleves army, which invaded Brabant in July. The Sound was closed against Dutch vessels and a fleet of 26 Danish vessels patrolled the North Sea. After a failed attempt by Hamburg to mediate between the belligerents, a Danish fleet of 40 ships and 10.000 men, set sail for the Walcheren. Yet this fleet would be scattered by a storm. In the Holsteinian-Imperial border, Johann Rantzau prevented an invasion from Germany.

Though the greatest effect was done by the closure of the Sound. This was the most effective war act by Christian III, because it excluded Dutch towns from trading with the Baltics.

== End of treaty ==
Despite Danish attempts, Francis I accused Denmark-Norway of not fulfilling its obligations, and thus when the emperor invited Christian III to the Imperial Diet at Speyer in 1544, Christian willingly accepted, and the Treaty of Speyer was thereafter concluded, ending the Dano-French alliance.

== See also ==
- Treaty of Speyer (1544) – 1544 treaty between Denmark-Norway and the Holy Roman Empire
- Count's Feud – 1534–1536 civil war in Denmark
- Christian II of Denmark – King of Denmark and Norway from 1513 to 1523
- Christina of Denmark – Duchess of Milan (1534–1535) and Lorraine (1544–1545)

== Works cited ==
- Jespersen, Leon (2012). Christian 3., 1503-1559 (in Danish). Aarhus: Danmarkshistorien.dk.
- Lockhart, Paul (2007). Denmark, 1513-1660: the rise and decline of a Renaissance monarchy. New York: Oxford.
- Ersland, Geir (2007). Norsk historie 1300-1625. Vol. II. New York: Oxford. pp. 148–49.
- Lockhart, Paul (2004). Frederik II and the Protestant Cause. Boston: Brill.
- Bain, Nisbet (2023). Scandinavia A Political History of Denmark, Norway and Sweden from 1512 to 1900. CUP Archive. p. 71.
- Merriman, Marcus (2000). The Rough Wooings. Birlinn.
