= Nebisgast =

Nebisgast was a 4th-century king of the Germanic Chamavi tribe. He is best known for leading raids into Roman Gaul and Toxandria in 358 AD, which prompted a military campaign by the Roman Emperor Julian. Julian defeated the Chamavi and forced Nebisgast to negotiate terms of submission.

== Etymology and Historical Context ==
While no direct family ties are recorded, Nebisgast is historically and linguistically linked to Nebiogastes, a high-ranking Roman general who lived roughly fifty years later (d. 407 AD).

The names Nebisgast (or Nebigast) and Nebiogastes are variants of the same early Frankish-Germanic name. It is composed of two roots: nebi- (cognate with Old Dutch neval, meaning "mist", "cloud", or "mystery") and -gast (meaning "guest" or "warrior"). Nebiogastes is the Latinized rendering of the Germanic name.

Although King Nebisgast fought against the Roman Empire in 358 AD, the relationship between Rome and the Frankish tribes shifted rapidly in the decades that followed. After their defeat, many Chamavi and other Franks integrated into the empire as foederati. Within a few generations, these Germanic warriors frequently rose to the highest echelons of the Roman military hierarchy.

The later general Nebiogastes was a product of this integration. He served as a high-ranking officer of Germanic descent in the Western Roman army. In 407 AD, he threw his support behind the rebellion of the Roman usurpation under Constantine III in Britain. Constantine III promoted Nebiogastes to the rank of magister militum of the Roman forces in Gaul. Later that same year, during a feigned peace negotiation, Nebiogastes was ambushed and killed by Sarus, a Gothic general loyal to the legitimate Western Roman Emperor Honorius.

== See also ==
- Hamaland
- Lists of rulers in the Low Countries
