= Treaty of Fontainebleau (November 1807) =

1807 treaty between France and Holland

The Kingdom of Holland after the Treaty of Fontainebleau

The Treaty of Fontainebleau was concluded on 11 November 1807 at the Palace of Fontainebleau between Napoleon Bonaparte's French Empire and his brother Louis Bonaparte's Kingdom of Holland. Under the terms of the treaty, Napoleon annexed the strategically important town of Vlissingen (Flushing) to France, while Louis received the province of East Frisia from the recently defeated Prussians in compensation. The treaty would prove to be the first step towards Napoleon's full annexation of Holland.

== Background ==
Vlissingen on the island of Walcheren had a well-defended naval base and was strategically located at the mouth of the Scheldt estuary, guarding the entrance to the key port of Antwerp. The town and the area of Dutch Flanders to the south were part of the province of Zeeland in the Dutch Republic until the region was occupied by the French in 1795, during the French Revolutionary Wars. Under the terms of the Treaty of The Hague in May of that year, which concluded the war between the French and Dutch, Dutch Flanders was ceded to France, while Vlissingen was placed under French-Dutch co-dominion, and the French were allowed to station a garrison at Vlissingen.

Napoleon had installed his brother Louis as the puppet king of Holland in 1806, but grew increasingly dismayed by his brother's refusal to introduce conscription and deliver troops and ships for the French war effort, as well as Louis' reluctance to enforce the Continental System and his tolerance of large-scale smuggling of goods to and from England. Napoleon therefore moved toward gradually dissolving the Kingdom of Holland and annexing the territory to his empire.

== Treaty ==
At the invitation of the French imperial cabinet, a group of representatives of the Kingdom of Holland travelled to Paris in September 1807 to negotiate a treaty. The treaty was signed at the Palace of Fontainebleau on 11 November 1807 by Jean-Baptiste de Nompère de Champagny, for France, and Willem Six van Oterleek, Johannes Goldberg and Frederik van Leyden van Westbarendrecht, for Holland.

Under the terms of treaty, the Kingdom of Holland ceded Vlissingen to France. However, Holland would continue to be responsible for maintaining the dykes protecting Vlissingen. In return, Louis would be compensated with territories from the Prussians and Russians, who had recently suffered crushing defeats against the French in the Battle of Jena–Auerstedt (October 1806) and Battle of Friedland (June 1807). The Kingdom of Holland would receive Jever from Russia and the province of East Frisia from Prussia, as well as the formerly independent territory of Kniphausen. In addition, would Louis receive the enclave of Luyksgestel, formerly ruled by the Prince-Bishopric of Liège, in exchange for Lommel, and would also receive several former Prussian enclaves in Gelderland: Zevenaar, Huissen and Malburgen (now part of Arnhem).

The treaty was officially ratified on 21 January 1808.

== Aftermath ==
The Treaty of Fontainebleau would be the first step towards Napoleon's full annexation of Holland, completed in 1810.

Protests against the French annexation of Vlissingen included an anonymous, clandestine pamphlet entitled Klagt eener Vlissingsche Moeder (Complaint by a Vlissingen Mother), in which a mother lamented that her sons would be forced to fight in the French army and said that the mothers of Vlissingen would do everything to protect their sons from this fate. She was furious about the gruesome disasters (ijsselijkste rampen) that would follow from the annexation and begged King Louis to be a "true father of the people" and rescue the inhabitants of Vlissingen from the French.

In violation of the terms of the treaty, the French general Monnet also occupied Fort Rammekens, a few miles east of Vlissingen, the French claiming that possession of the fort was essential to the defense of the town.

In the night of 14–15 January 1808, just months after the treaty, the province of Zeeland was hit by a heavy storm which caused severe flooding. The damage and loss caused by the storm was highest in Vlissingen, where a number of houses collapsed and 31 inhabitants lost their lives.

In July 1809, the British landed an expeditionary force on the island of Walcheren. The aim of the campaign was to destroy the French fleet thought to be in Vlissingen, and block off the port of Antwerp. The French garrison at Vlissingen capitulated to the British on 15 August after the town was bombarded by the British navy, suffering heavy damage. However, the campaign was ultimately a failure and the British forces withdrew from Walcheren by the end of that year.

Following the treaty, Vlissingen became part of the French arrondissement of Eeklo in the department of Escaut, and in 1810 the town joined the arrondissement of Middelburg in the newly-formed department of Bouches-de-l'Escaut. After Napoleon's defeat in 1814, Vlissingen became part of the new United Kingdom of the Netherlands.

East Frisia joined the Kingdom of Holland as the department of Oostfreesland. Upon annexation of the kingdom by Napoleon, most of it became the Département Ems-Oriental. East Frisia was re-annexed by Prussia in 1813 but given over to the Kingdom of Hanover, ruled by British king George III, in 1815.

Zevenaar, Huissen and Malburgen (now part of Arnhem), the former Prussian enclaves in Gelderland which had been given over to the Kingdom of Holland as part of the treaty, did not join Holland for several years because the new owner of those territories, Joachim Murat's Grand Duchy of Berg, delayed relinquishing them. In 1808 Dutch troops marched into Zevenaar and officially took possession of the town. The enclaves were reclaimed by Prussia in 1813 but became part of the United Kingdom of the Netherlands in 1816.
