= Louis Claude Monnet de Lorbeau =

Louis Claude Monnet de Lorbeau (French pronunciation: [lwi klod mɔnɛ də lɔʁbo]; Mougon, Deux-Sèvres 1 January 1766 – Paris, 8 June 1819) was a general of France, most notable for his failure to prevent the landing of the Walcheren expedition.

== Life ==
He commanded the National Guard of Sainte-Néomaye from 1789 to 1792, but only joined the regular army on 28 March 1793, as a captain in the 36th Battalion of the Deux-Sèvres and Charente, nicknamed le Vengeur. He took part in the campaigns of 1790 to 1793 during the War in the Vendée. Always at a perilous post, he fought with distinction and won his generals' confidence. In 1790, in the Fontenay affair, the 4,000-strong Republican army was attacked by 30,000 men and the brigade in which Monnet was serving was for an instant shaken by the terrible artillery fire. However, hearing of Monnet's courage, they soon formed ranks and charged this artillery, encouraging the following troops to capture the artillery from the insurgents and thus beat them into retreat. In 1791 he won new renown at the fighting at Luçon, Mortagne, Châtillon, Saint-Florent, Angers, Laval, Antzin and particularly in the Saint-Denis affair. At Saint-Denis he and 600 combatants beat and threw into complete rout a force of 6,000 men under Charette before general Broussard's division could come to back up Monnet's attack.

For his actions at Saint-Denis, he won the praise of Lazare Hoche, who promoted him to chef de bataillon on 25 November 1795 (4 frimaire year IV) and put him in command of a mobile column to pursue the remnants of Charette's army. The French Directory was also informed of his good conduct and made him commander of the 31st demi-brigade by decree of 23 July 1796 (5 thermidor). Monnet continued to pursue the insurgents in the Vendée, marching along the most difficult roads, supplying his troops despite the scorched earth terrain in which they were operating, defeating the enemy everywhere, forcing the submission of Montaigu and la Roche-sur-Yon (whose inhabitants handed over their weapons) and finally completing his mission by capturing Charette and the revolts' thirteen leaders in the forêt de Grasla. Summoned to command the département of Deux-Sèvres, which he purged of the bands of brigands that were infesting it.

In 1793 he and his brigade moved to the armée du Rhin and in 1794 took part in general Schaenbourg's corps d'armée, intended to penetrate into Helvetia. Monnet fought at Berne and covering himself in glory at the Sion affair. The enemy were guarding the bridge of the Morga pass and holding the high ground, entrenched behind the stream bordering their camp. The battle lasted most of a day

== Sources ==
- Mullié, Charles (1852). "MONNET (LOUIS-CLAUDE, baron)" . Biographie des célébrités militaires des armées de terre et de mer de 1789 à 1850 (in French). Paris: Poignavant et Compagnie.
