= Treaty of Speyer (1544) =

1544 treaty between Denmark-Norway and the Holy Roman Empire

The Treaty of Speyer or Peace of Speyer was signed on 23 May 1544 between Denmark-Norway and the Holy Roman Empire during an Imperial Diet of the Holy Roman Empire in Speyer, Germany.

== Background ==
The Union of Kalmar broke apart in 1521 with the deposition of King Christian II of Denmark in Sweden; he was deposed again in Denmark-Norway eighteen months later. Sweden, under Gustaf Vasa, emerged as the main competitor of Denmark-Norway in the Baltic Sea. During the reformation in Denmark-Norway, 1536-1537, Holy Roman Emperor Charles V supported Frederick of Wittelsbach as king of Norway, in opposition against Christian III. After Christian III became king of Denmark and Norway, he imposed heavy tolls on the Sound and two other channels between the North Sea and the Baltic Sea, in an effort to end the Dutch dominance of trade in the Baltic region. Under pressure from Charles V, he agreed to exempt the Dutch ships from these tolls and give them free and unfettered access to the Baltic.

== Treaty ==
In the treaty, Charles V recognized Christian III as the rightful king of Denmark and Norway, and promised not to provide military support to his rival Christian II. A secret clause in the treaty also pledged that Charles V would not support Christian II's heirs, including his daughters, Christina of Denmark and Dorothea of Denmark, wives of Duke Francis I of Lorraine and Frederick of Wittelsbach respectively, in the future. In exchange for this, the Dano-Norwegian policy became pro-Hapsburg to prevent against direct threats from the Empire. An additional clause also declared that the King of Denmark-Norway would respect the rights of the Teutonic Order in return for Charles V's respect for Albrecht of Prussia - Albrecht was married to Christian III's sister, Dorothea, Duchess of Prussia. Denmark-Norway had also sold its Estonian territories to the Teutonic Order, but still maintained large estates in the region; both Christian III and his father Frederick I of Denmark had pressed the issue with the Teutonic Order in the past.

The Treaty of Speyer dictated Christian III's foreign policy for the rest of his life. He kept Denmark-Norway at peace, refusing to involve the countries in Protestant-Catholic conflicts such as the Schmalkaldic War of 1546. The Dutch would continue to dominate Baltic trade for another two centuries.

== See also ==
- List of treaties
