= Walcheren Campaign =

1809 British military expedition to the Netherlands

- Part of the War of the Fifth Coalition
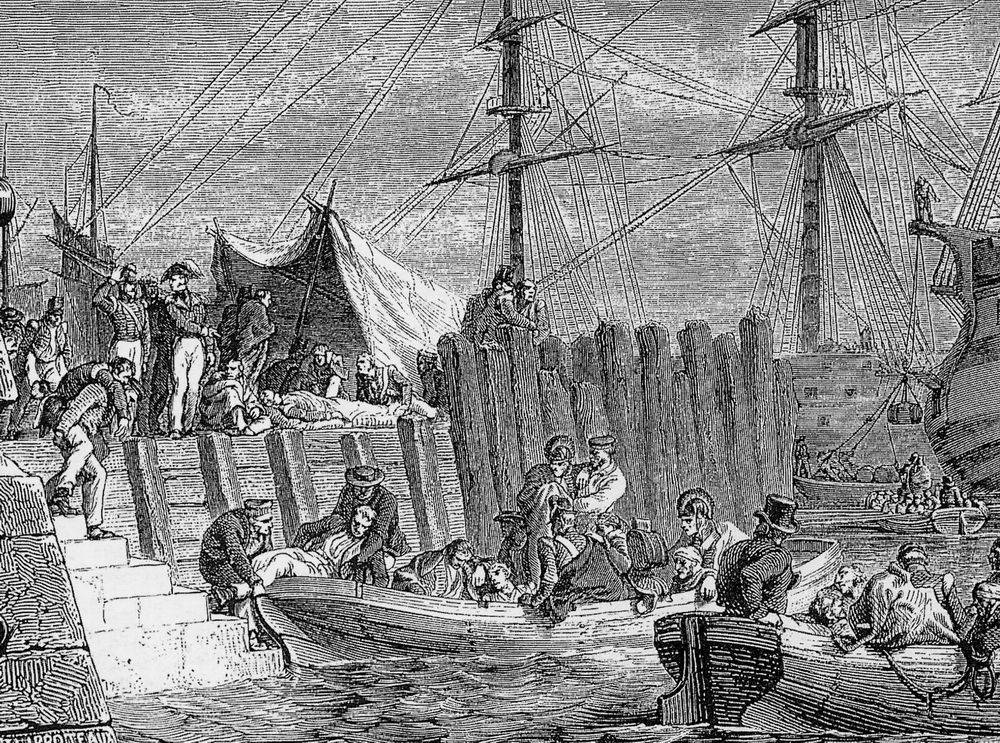
- Illness-stricken British forces evacuating Walcheren on 30 August
Date	30 July – 23 December 1809
Location	Walcheren, Kingdom of Holland 51.52°N 3.58°E
Result	Franco-Dutch victory

Belligerents
France; Kingdom of Holland	United Kingdom

Commanders and leaders
(France) Jean-Baptiste Bernadotte (France) Jean-Baptiste Bessières (France) Louis Claude Monnet de Lorbeau (Netherlands) Jean-Baptiste Dumonceau	(United Kingdom) Lord Chatham (United Kingdom) Sir Richard Strachan (United Kingdom) Alexander Mackenzie Fraser †

Strength
30 July: approx. 19,000 (throughout the strongholds); 16 August: up to 40,000; 26 August: almost 100,000	39,000–40,000; 37 ships of the line 200 smaller ships 400 transports

Casualties and losses
Total casualties unknown: At least 8,000 in and around Vlissingen, including: • approx. 5,000 capitulated; (Note: Taking into account all British and French returns (from Fortescue)); • over 1,800 captured or deserted; • over 1,000 sick and wounded; • 162 killed.	Total casualties unknown, but considerable approx. 370 killed or wounded, (Note: The number of wounded is unknown. This casualty figure is a rough estimate based on the following: • Bodart (1916), Losses of Life in Modern Wars, p. 18; • Burnham (2000).) with 106 of them confirmed dead Only from 30 July to 17 August: 738 killed, wounded, or missing 3,500–4,066 died of disease 11,513 sick

War of the Fifth Coalition:
Walcheren Campaign

The Walcheren Campaign (Dutch pronunciation: [ˈʋɑlxərə(n)]) was an unsuccessful British expedition to the Kingdom of Holland in 1809 intended to open another front in the Austrian Empire's struggle with France during the War of the Fifth Coalition. John Pitt, 2nd Earl of Chatham, the commander of the expedition, was ordered to capture the towns of Flushing (Vlissingen) and Antwerp and thus enable British ships to safely traverse the Scheldt River.

A British expeditionary force of 39,000 troops, together with field artillery and two siege trains, crossed the North Sea and landed at Walcheren on 30 July. This was the largest British expedition of that year, larger than the army serving in the Peninsular War in the Iberian Peninsula. Nevertheless, it failed to achieve any of its goals. The campaign involved little fighting, but heavy losses from the sickness popularly dubbed "Walcheren Fever". Despite initial local successes against scattered French forces, the British army and navy were stalled by Lord Chatham's slow, indecisive leadership combined with the arrival of French Marshal Bernadotte (the future Swedish king) at the front. By concentrating up to 40,000 troops in Antwerp and then strengthening the beleaguered forts, Bernadotte ensured the Franco-Dutch defenses could no longer be overcome. Lord Chatham did not dare to take other possible steps, such as moving further instead of focusing all his efforts on the forts when he had this opportunity.

On 11 September Marshal Bessières replaced Bernadotte as commander-in-chief and oversaw the disintegration of the British army until December. The reason for the replacement was Napoleon's distrust and disrelish of Bernadotte, whom he saw as vain since Bernadotte was overstating his capabilities without fear of consequences.

The Walcheren campaign is a typical example of a poorly thought-out and indecisive operation that cost Britain a lot of money and human lives, but did not produce any positive results. Although more than 4,000 British troops died during the expedition, only 106 were killed in action; the survivors withdrew on 9 December. Defending Franco-Dutch forces also suffered heavy casualties, including 4,000 men dead, wounded or captured.

== Background ==
The blockade of the Scheldt was declared as early as 14 May 1809, but no reconnaissance or sounding of the entrance fairways has been carried out before the campaign began.

In July 1809, the British decided to seal the estuary of the Scheldt to prevent the port of Antwerp being used as a base against them. The primary aim of the campaign was to destroy the French fleet thought to be in Flushing while providing a diversion for the hard-pressed Austrians. However, the Battle of Wagram had already occurred before the start of the campaign and the Austrians had effectively already lost the war.

John Pitt, 2nd Earl of Chatham commanded the army, and Sir Richard Strachan commanded the navy, the full expeditionary force of 37 ships, the greatest to have ever left England, leaving The Downs on 28 July. Commanders included Hugh Downman, Edward Codrington, Amelius Beauclerk, William Charles Fahie, George Cockburn and George Dundas.

General John Pitt combined initial tactical successes with an eventual strategic retreat, but errors were overshadowed by eventual failure Helder Expedition.

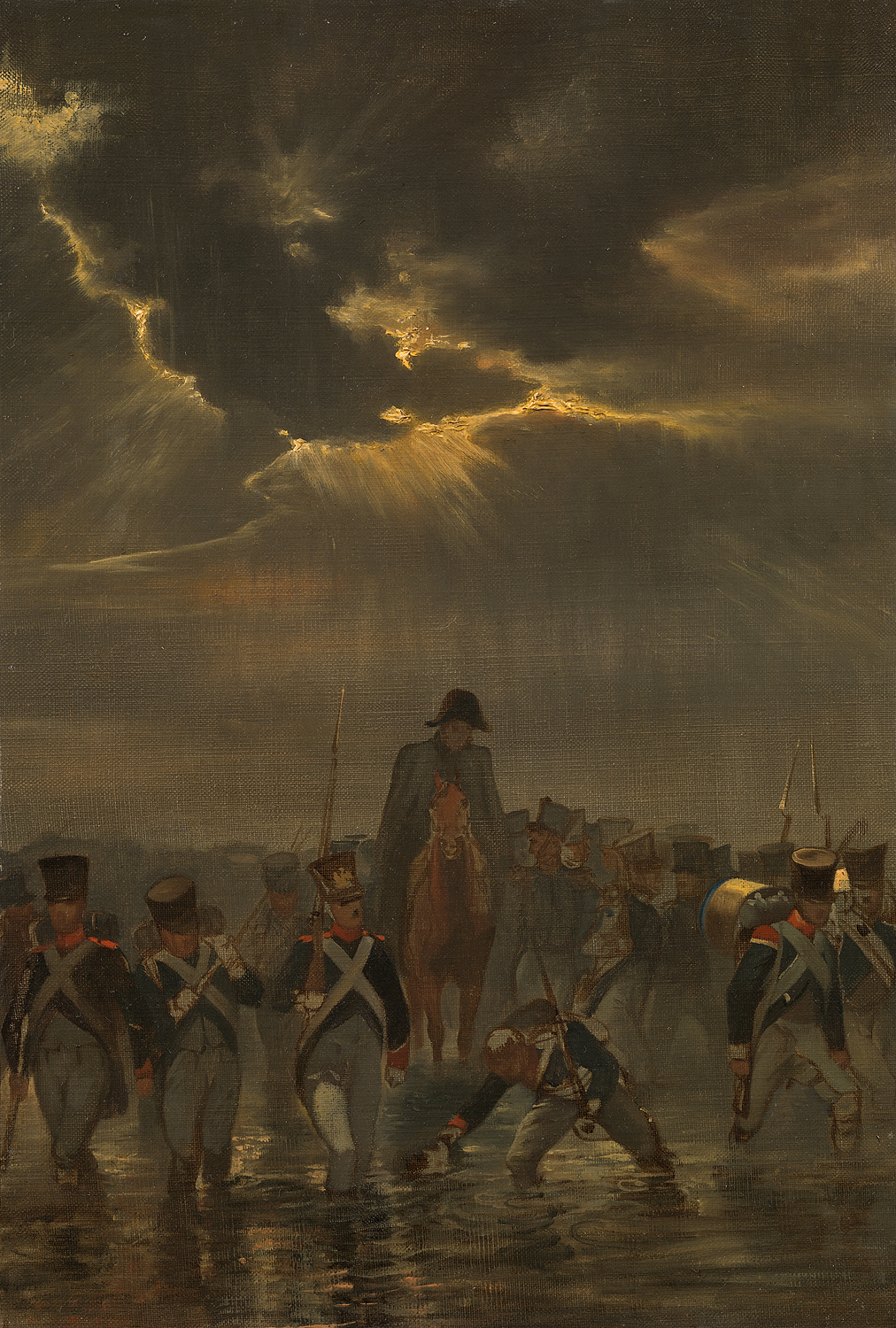
General Cort Heijligers's expedition to recapture Bath, Karel Frederik Bombled

== Campaign ==
As a first move, the British seized the swampy island of Walcheren at the mouth of river Scheldt, as well as South Beveland island, both in the present-day Netherlands. The British troops soon began to suffer from "Walcheren fever", due to the symptoms present most likely a combination of malaria, typhus, typhoid and dysentery. Within a month of seizing the island, they had over 8,000 fever cases. The medical provisions for the expedition proved inadequate despite reports that an occupying French force had lost 80% of its numbers a few years earlier, also due to disease. Once it had been decided to garrison Walcheren Island in September 1809, Pitt was replaced by Lieutenant-general Eyre Coote who in October was replaced by Lieutenant-general George Don.

The British were divided into three columns: "Walcheren" (whose task was to capture Walcheren Island and the fortifications of Flushing), "Schouwen", and "Cadzand". On 31 July the Walcheren Column seized the Veere fortification and moved to Flushing. On 1 August, the Schouwen Column landed at Wemeldinge, taking the Bath fortification (which blocked the entrances to both branches of the Scheldt) without a fight the next day, while a misunderstanding led the Cadzand Column to land on South Beveland on 31 July, allowing the French to reinforce Flushing via a pontoon bridge between Walcheren and Cadzand until 8 August. It is incomprehensible why Lord Chatham, having an entire squadron, was unable to break this connection in time. With the capture of Bath, the British opened the road to Antwerp through the eastern arm of the Scheldt, accessible to small frigates and gunboats, and to South Beveland. Despite a 40,000-man corps, Lord Chatham's decision to besiege Flushing for two weeks rather than advancing directly to Antwerp left a 21,000-man force idle at Bath, stalling the expedition.

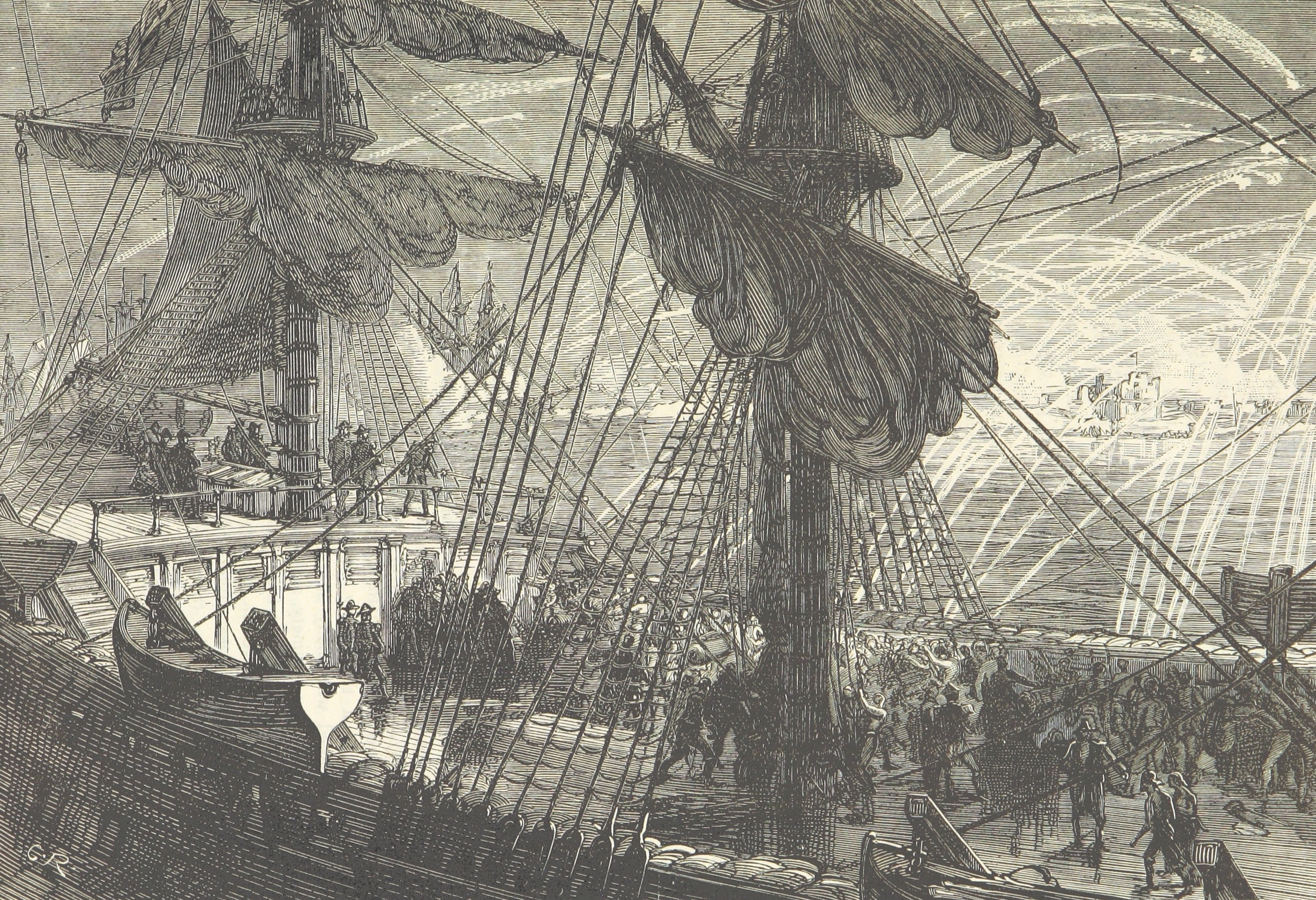
The bombardment of Flushing

On 30 July, the French garrisons in the Low Countries were distributed as follows:

- Flushing – 4,000;
- Cadzand – 300;
- Antwerp – 2,400;
- St. Omer – 6,000;
- Ghent – 3,000–4,000;
- the rest of the Low Countries – 3,000.

At the time of the initial landings, the French forces were characterized by a divided command over a motley crew of units manned by soldiers of many nationalities spanning French-occupied Europe. There were a few French units among those present considered to be of inferior quality as they were manned by the physically infirm and dregs of the training depots.

However, on 10 August 1809, as reinforcements began flowing into the invasion zone, Napoleon approved the appointment of Marshal Jean-Baptiste Bernadotte, the Prince of Ponte Corvo, who had recently resigned his command after incurring Napoleon's displeasure at the Battle of Wagram as overall commander of the invasion zone. Bernadotte had returned to Paris and was sent to defend the Netherlands by the council of ministers. His arrival gave the French a much-needed unity of command and he brought with him a genius for organization and training. Bernadotte led the reinforced and reorganized French forces competently and although the British had captured Flushing on the day of his arrival to the war zone after a ferocious bombardment, and the surrounding towns on 15 August, he had already ordered the French fleet to Antwerp and heavily reinforced the city. By this time the French had already managed to concentrate up to 40,000 men in Antwerp and put the main forts of the Upper Scheldt into a defensive state. A rapid and decisive forward movement might still have saved the expedition, but instead, Lord Chatham confined himself to aimless skirmishing with the forts of the Upper Scheldt, bombarded Cadzand and Fort Terneuzen, and finally, on 26 August, convened a council of war. At this council, it became clear that an advance on Antwerp was utterly impossible, as the French (under Bernadotte) had already managed to concentrate nearly 100,000 men there. Both the French numbers and defences were such that the main objective for the British, Antwerp, was now out of reach. The British began a staged withdrawal to Walcheren.

The expedition was called off in early September. Around 12,000 troops stayed on Walcheren, but by October only 5,500 remained fit for duty. The French had no great opportunity to eliminate Chatham's army, since the waterbodies were defended by the dominant British navy. Despite the failure of the British to capture Antwerp, Napoleon remained uneasy about the political situation in France during his absence campaigning in Austria. Napoleon and Bernadotte had a history of antagonism and while in Vienna Napoleon feared a conspiracy between Bernadotte and Fouché. To ensure that Bernadotte was not conspiring with anti-Bonapartist elements in Paris, Napoleon dispatched General Reille to keep a keen eye on the Prince of Ponte Corvo in Antwerp. Though no conspiracy was found, Napoleon relieved Bernadotte on September 11th, 1809, upon reading an Order of the Day issued by Bernadotte (according to whom he was merely praising his troops to raise their morale) wherein the marshal stated "his 15,000 men would be enough to repel any British number," Napoleon disapproved and said:

"This is the first occasion on which a General has been known to betray his position by an excess of vanity."

Napoleon sent the stolid and reliable Marshal Bessières to replace Bernadotte. Bessières remained in Antwerp until the departure of the British. On 24 December, the remnants of Chatham's army, encircled by superior French forces, having destroyed the port facilities of Flushing, boarded ships.

== Aftermath ==
In all, the British government spent almost £8 million on the campaign. Along with the 4,000 men who had died during the campaign, almost 12,000 were still ill by February 1810 and many others remained permanently weakened. Those sent to the Peninsular War to join Wellington's army caused a permanent doubling of the sick lists there.

This campaign led to the plant known as Thanet cress being introduced to Britain in the sick men's bedding.

The debacle was also a source of acute political embarrassment, in particular for Lord Castlereagh upon whom the former United Irishman, Peter Finnerty, who at the invitation of Sir Home Popham accompanied the expedition as a special correspondent for The Morning Chronicle, heaped the blame.

== Order of battle ==
The below order of battle is for 28 July.

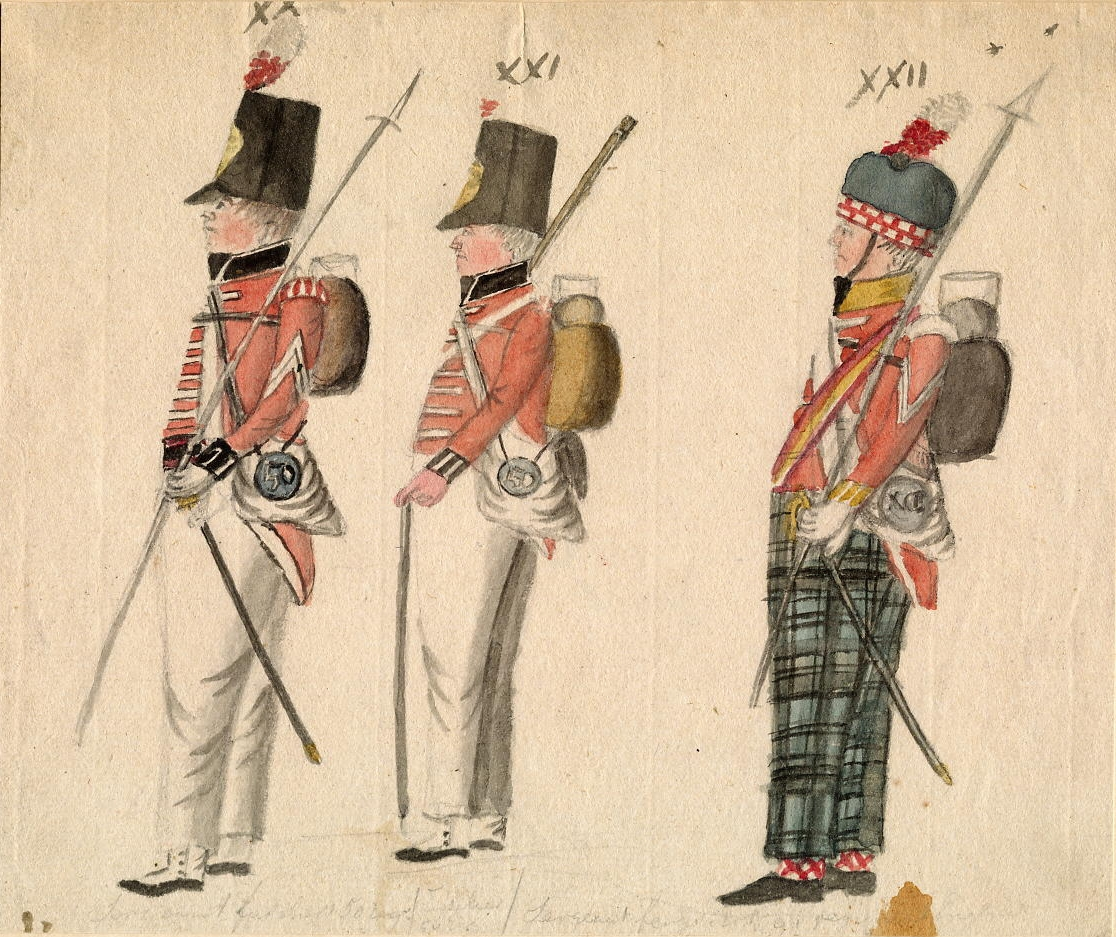
Illustration of a sergeant and private of the 50th Foot and sergeant of the 91st Foot made during the campaign

=== British Expeditionary Force to Walcheren ===
British Expeditionary Force to Walcheren
- British Expeditionary Force to Walcheren, commanded by Lieutenant General, Master-General of the Ordnance John Pitt, 2nd Earl of Chatham
  - Second-in-Command, Lieutenant General Sir Eyre Coote
  - Chief of Staff, Colonel Sir Robert Brownrigg
  - Royal Waggon Train (3 x Troops)
  - Royal Artillery, commanded by Brigadier General Master Gunner, Sir John Macleod (total of 70 x guns and 74 x mortars) (Note: The term 'Company' was merely an official title, in the field the term 'brigade' was used instead, though both were the same strength, led by a Captain or Major.)
    - H Troop, Royal Horse Artillery
    - No. 1 Company, 2nd Battalion, Royal Regiment of Artillery
    - No. 6 Company, 2nd Battalion, Royal Regiment of Artillery
    - No. 1 Company, 3rd Battalion, Royal Regiment of Artillery
    - No. 2 Company, 3rd Battalion, Royal Regiment of Artillery
    - No. 3 Company, 3rd Battalion, Royal Regiment of Artillery
    - No. 4 Company, 3rd Battalion, Royal Regiment of Artillery
    - No. 7 Company, 3rd Battalion, Royal Regiment of Artillery
    - No. 8 Company, 3rd Battalion, Royal Regiment of Artillery
    - No. 9 Company, 3rd Battalion, Royal Regiment of Artillery
    - No. 10 Company, 3rd Battalion, Royal Regiment of Artillery
    - No. 5 Company, 5th Battalion, Royal Regiment of Artillery
    - No. 6 Company, 5th Battalion, Royal Regiment of Artillery
    - No. 4 Company, 9th Battalion, Royal Regiment of Artillery
    - No. 5 Company, 9th Battalion, Royal Regiment of Artillery
    - No. 7 Company, 9th Battalion, Royal Regiment of Artillery
    - No. 8 Company, 9th Battalion, Royal Regiment of Artillery
    - No. 10 Company, 9th Battalion, Royal Regiment of Artillery
    - Chatham Company, Corps of Royal Military Artificers
    - 1 unknown Company, Corps of Royal Military Artificers
  - Left Wing
    - 1st Division, commanded by Lieutenant General John Francis Cradock
      - Graham's Brigade, commanded by Major General Thomas Graham
        - 3rd Battalion, 1st (Royal) Regiment of Foot
        - 2nd Battalion, 35th (Royal Sussex) Regiment of Foot
        - 2nd Battalion, 81st (Loyal Lincoln Volunteers) Regiment of Foot
      - Houston's Brigade, commanded by Major General William Houston
        - 2nd Battalion, 14th (Buckinghamshire) Regiment of Foot
        - 51st (2nd Yorkshire, West Riding) Regiment of Foot (Light Infantry)
        - 2nd Battalion, 63rd (West Suffolk) Regiment of Foot
    - 4th Division, commanded by Lieutenant General Alexander MacKenzie Fraser
      - Browne's Brigade, commanded by Brigadier General Gore Browne
        - 1st Battalion, 5th (Northumberland Fusiliers) Regiment of Foot
        - 4 x Companies, 2nd Battalion, 23rd (Royal Welsh Fusiliers) Regiment of Foot
        - 1st Battalion, 26th (Cameronian) Regiment of Foot
        - 1st Battalion, 32nd (Cornwall) Regiment of Foot
      - Picton's Brigade, commanded by Major General Thomas Picton
        - 1st Battalion, 36th (Herefordshire) Regiment of Foot
        - 2 x Company, 2nd Battalion, 8th (The King's) Regiment of Foot
        - 77th (East Middlesex) Regiment of Foot
        - 1st Battalion, 82nd (Prince of Wales's Volunteers) Regiment of Foot
    - Light Troops
      - Mahon's Brigade, commanded by The Honourable Brigadier General Thomas Mahon
        - 9th Regiment of (Light) Dragoons
      - Rottenburg's Brigade, commanded by Brigadier General Franz Rottenburg, Baron de Rottenburg
        - 68th (Durham) Regiment of Foot (Light Infantry)
        - 1st Battalion, 71st (Highland) Regiment of Foot (Light Infantry)
        - 85th Regiment of Foot (Bucks Volunteers) (Light Infantry)
        - 2 x Companies, 2nd Battalion, 95th Regiment of Foot (Rifles)
  - Right Wing
    - 2nd Division, commanded by Lieutenant General George Gordon, Marquess of Huntly
      - 1 x Company, 2nd Battalion, 95th Regiment of Foot (Rifles)
      - Dyott's Brigade, commanded by Major General William Dyott
        - 1st Battalion, 6th (1st Warwickshire) Regiment of Foot
        - 1st Battalion, 50th (Queen's Own) Regiment of Foot
        - 1st Battalion, 91st (Argyllshire) Regiment of Foot
      - Montresor's Brigade, commanded by Brigadier General Henry Tucker Montresor
        - 1st Battalion, 9th (East Norfolk) Regiment of Foot
        - 1st Battalion, 38th (1st Staffordshire) Regiment of Foot
        - 1st Battalion, 42nd (Royal Highland) Regiment of Foot
    - 3rd Division, commanded by Lieutenant General Thomas Grosvenor
      - Leith's Brigade, commanded by Major General James Leith
        - 2nd Battalion, 11th (North Devon) Regiment of Foot
        - 2nd Battalion, 59th (2nd Nottinghamshire) Regiment of Foot
        - 1st Battalion, 79th (Cameron Highlanders) Regiment of Foot
      - Acland's Brigade, commanded by Brigadier General Wroth Palmer Acland
        - 2nd (Queen's Royal) Regiment of Foot
        - 76th (Hindoostan) Regiment of Foot
        - 2nd Battalion, 84th (York and Lancaster) Regiment of Foot
    - Light Division, commanded by Lieutenant General James Saint Clair-Erskin, 2nd Earl of Rosslyn
      - von Linsingen's Brigade, commanded by Karl Christian von Lisingen
        - 3rd (King's Own) Regiment of Dragoons
        - 12th (Prince of Wales's) Regiment of (Light) Dragoons
        - 2nd Hussars, King's German Legion
      - Stewart's Brigade, commanded by Major General William Stewart
        - 2nd Battalion, 43rd (Monmouthshire) Regiment of Foot (Light Infantry)
        - 2nd Battalion, 52nd (Oxfordshire) Regiment of Foot (Light Infantry)
        - 8 x Companies, 2nd Battalion, 95th Regiment of Foot (Rifles)
      - von Alten's Brigade, commanded by Victor, Baron von Alten
        - 1st Light Battalion, King's German Legion
        - 2nd Light Battalion, King's German Legion
  - Reserve Army, commanded by Lieutenant General The Honourable John Hope, 4th Earl of Hopetoun
    - 1 x Company, 2nd Battalion, 95th Regiment of Foot (Rifles)
    - Disney's Brigade, commanded by Moore Disney
      - 1st Battalion, 1st Regiment of Foot Guards
      - 3rd Battalion, 1st Regiment of Foot Guards
      - Flank Companies (Grenadiers and Light Infantry), 2nd Battalions of Coldstream Regiment of Foot Guards and 3rd Regiment of Foot Guards
    - Erskine's Brigade, commanded by Major General Sir William Erskine, 2nd Baronet
      - 20th (East Devonshire) Regiment of Foot
      - 1st Battalion, 92nd (Gordon Highlanders) Regiment of Foot
    - Earl of Dalhousie's Brigade, commanded by Major General Lord George Ramsay, 9th Earl of Dalhousie
      - 1st Battalion, 4th (King's Own Royal) Regiment of Foot
      - 2nd Battalion, 4th (King's Own Royal) Regiment of Foot
      - 1st Battalion, 28th (North Gloucestershire) Regiment of Foot

=== Corps of Observation of Holland ===
Corps of Observation of Holland

The French local forces were not organized into a separate corps of observation till the later part of the year, but were organized as such by the end of the campaign and are therefore shown here. Note: According to Smith pp. 294–301, the artillery came from the following regiments: 1st, 2nd, 4th, and 8th Foot Artillery and 4th and 5th Horse Artillery.

- Corps of Observation of Holland, commanded by (initially) by General de Division Louis Claude Monnet de Lorbeau, later Maréchal d'Empire Jean-Baptiste Bernadotte, Prince de Ponte Corvo
  - 1st Colonial Battalion (869)
  - 1st Deserters Battalion (1,089)
  - 1st Battalion, Irish Legion
  - 1st Battalion, Régiment de Prusse (43)
  - 2nd Battalion, Régiment de Prusse (829)
  - 3rd Battalion, Régiment de Prusse (837)
  - 6th Veteran Battalion
  - 1st and 2nd Companies, 2nd Veteran Battalion (52)
  - 67 x Gunners of the Coast Guard
  - 67 x Veteran Artillerists
  - 4 x Gendarmes
    - From 1 August
    - 4th Battalion, 8th Provisional Demi-Brigade (608)
      - 2 x Companies, 22nd Line Infantry Regiment
      - 2 x Companies, 45th Line Infantry Regiment
      - 2 x Companies, 54th Line Infantry Regiment
    - Detachment, 72nd Line Infantry Regiment
    - Detachment, 108th Line Infantry Regiment (375)
    - 20 x Artillerists
  - 3 x Companies, 4th Battalion, 48th Line Infantry Regiment (320) – from 4 August
  - From 6 August
    - 3 x Companies, 4th Battalion, 48th Line Infantry Regiment (42)
    - 8th Provisional Demi-Brigade (55)
      - 3 x Companies, 5th Battalion, 13th Light Infantry Regiment
      - 3 x Companies, 5th Battalion, 27th Light Infantry Regiment
  - From 9 August
    - 2 x Battalions, 5th Dutch Line Infantry Regiment (1,000)
    - 4,000 troops of the French National Guard
    - 1st, 2nd, and 3rd Battalions, 48th Line Infantry Regiment
  - 8,000 National Guardsmen – from 14 August
  - From 15 August
    - Detachments from the 26th, 66th, and 82nd Line Infantry Regiments (1,500)
    - Remainder of the 8th Provisional Demi-Brigade
    - Detachments of the Depots of the Dragoon Regiments from the 1st Military Division
    - 26th Chasseurs à Cheval Regiment
    - 28th Chasseurs à Cheval Regiment
  - 4,000 Dutch Troops from Bergen op Zoom – from 16 August
  - 1,500 French Troops – from 25 August

== Naval forces ==
A fleet of around 40 vessels, including sixteen 74 gun warships of the third rate, participated under the overall command of Strachan. A number of smaller vessels including customs-house and excise cutters were also involved, as was a packet ship. The City of London, Loyal Greenwich, and Royal Harbour River Fencibles also contributed men to the expedition.

== Irish legion ==
The 1st battalion of the Irish Legion (raised by the French for an invasion of Ireland that never happened) was stationed in Flushing during the assault and received its baptism of fire there. It fought a rear guard action for several days but the battalion was almost completely captured. The Legion's brass band followed by the Irish battalion led the surrendered French garrison out of the town. However, a small party of Irishmen escaped and went into hiding with the battalion's cherished imperial eagle, and after a few days they crossed the Scheldt River and escaped. Commandant Lawless was presented to Napoleon and he together with Captain O'Reilly received the Légion d'honneur in gratitude.

== See also ==
- Battle of the Basque Roads

Preceded by Battle of Talavera	Napoleonic Wars; Walcheren Campaign	Succeeded by Battle of Ölper (1809)
