= Hulhuizen =

- Hamlet
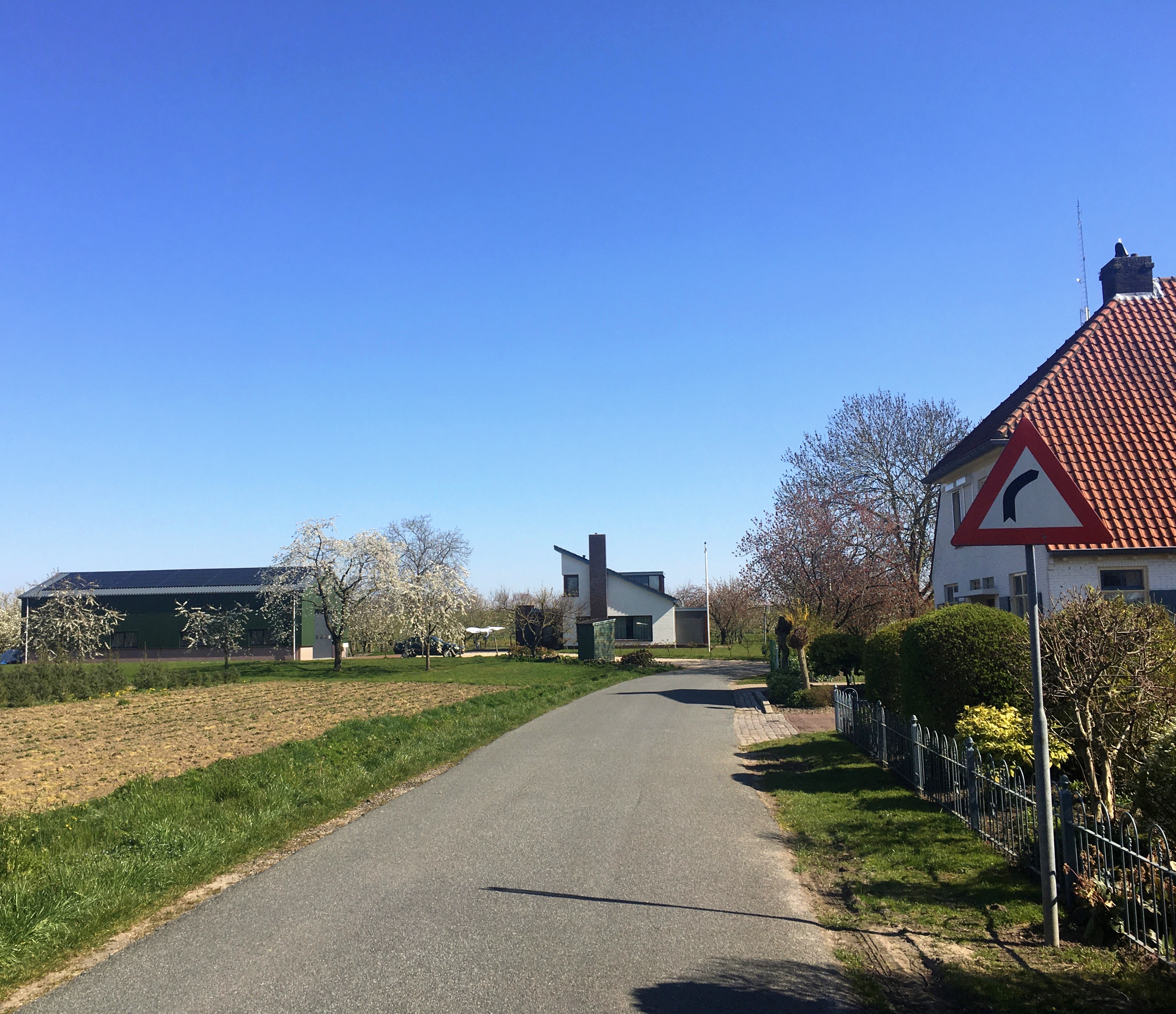
- Street view of Hulhuizen

- Location in the Netherlands Hulhuizen (Netherlands)
- Coordinates: 51.8803°N 5.8886°E
- Country: Netherlands
- Province: Gelderland
- Municipality: Lingewaard
- Elevation: 11 m (36 ft)
- Time zone: UTC+1 (CET)
  - Summer (DST): UTC+2 (CEST)
- Postal code: 6691
- Dialing code: 0481

Hulhuizen is a hamlet near Gendt in the municipality of Lingewaard in the province of Gelderland, the Netherlands. Hulhuizen became Dutch in 1817 together with Huissen.

== History ==
It was first mentioned in 1253 as Hulhusen, and means houses on a hill. Hulhuizen is not a statistical entity, and the postal authority have placed it under Gendt.

Hulhuizen used to be an enclave of the Duchy of Cleves which later became part of the Kingdom of Prussia. In 1608, it was a complete village, however the Waal River kept on taking parts of the village. In 1707, it was completely destroyed, and after rebuilding only a little hamlet returned in its place.

Most parts of the Prussian enclaves inside the Netherlands were transferred on 1 June 1816 except for Hulhuizen, because Prussia demanded a return gift. The village was exchanged for Schenkenschanz (Dutch name: Schenkenschans), and became Dutch on 1 March 1817. In 1840, Hulhuizen was home to 422 people. Nowadays, it consists of about 150 houses.

There used to be a castle near Hulhuizen, however it was flooded and destroyed in the 17th century. The castle was built in 1253. The exact location is still unknown.

== Gallery ==
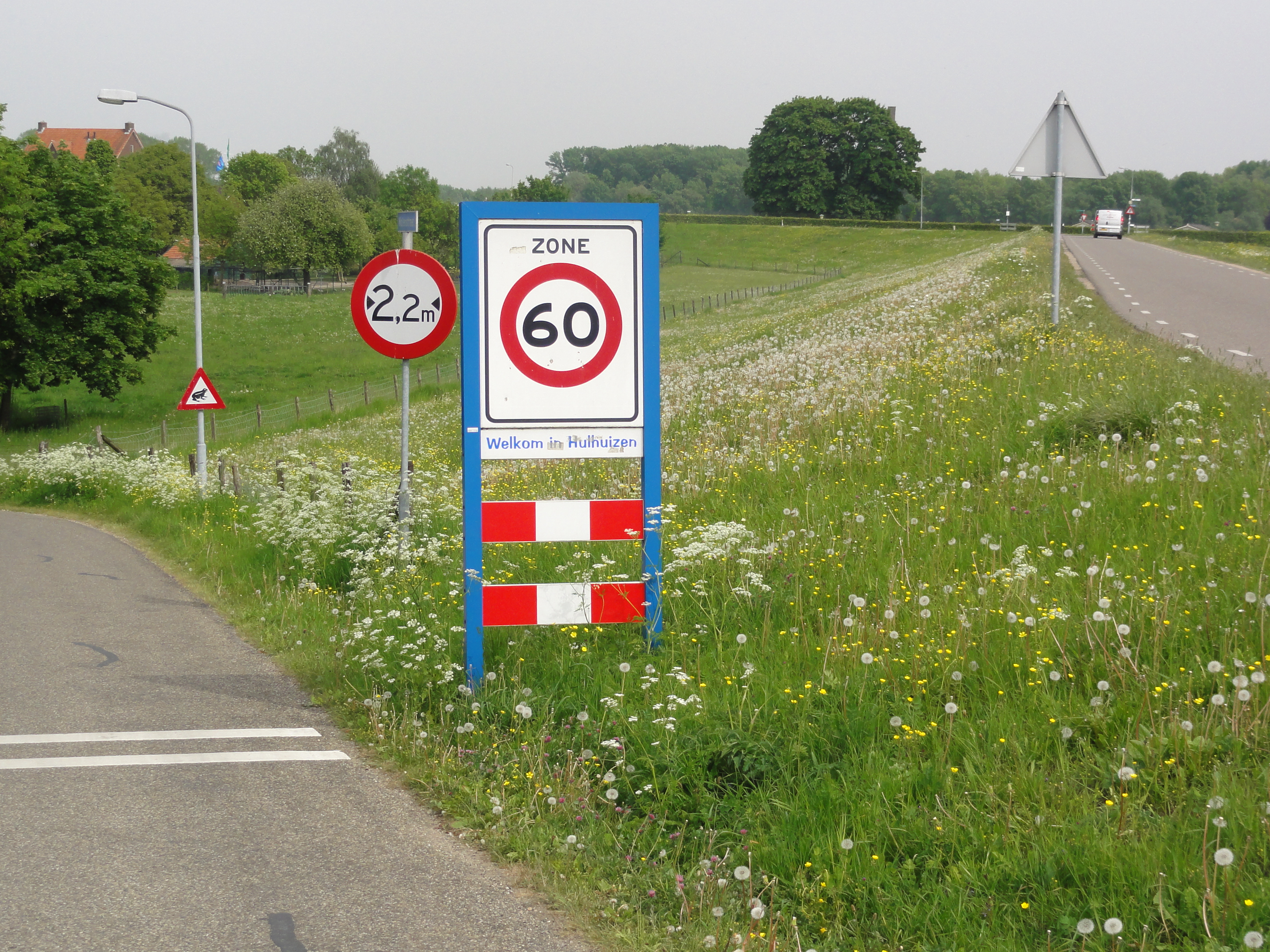
Hulhuizen entrance

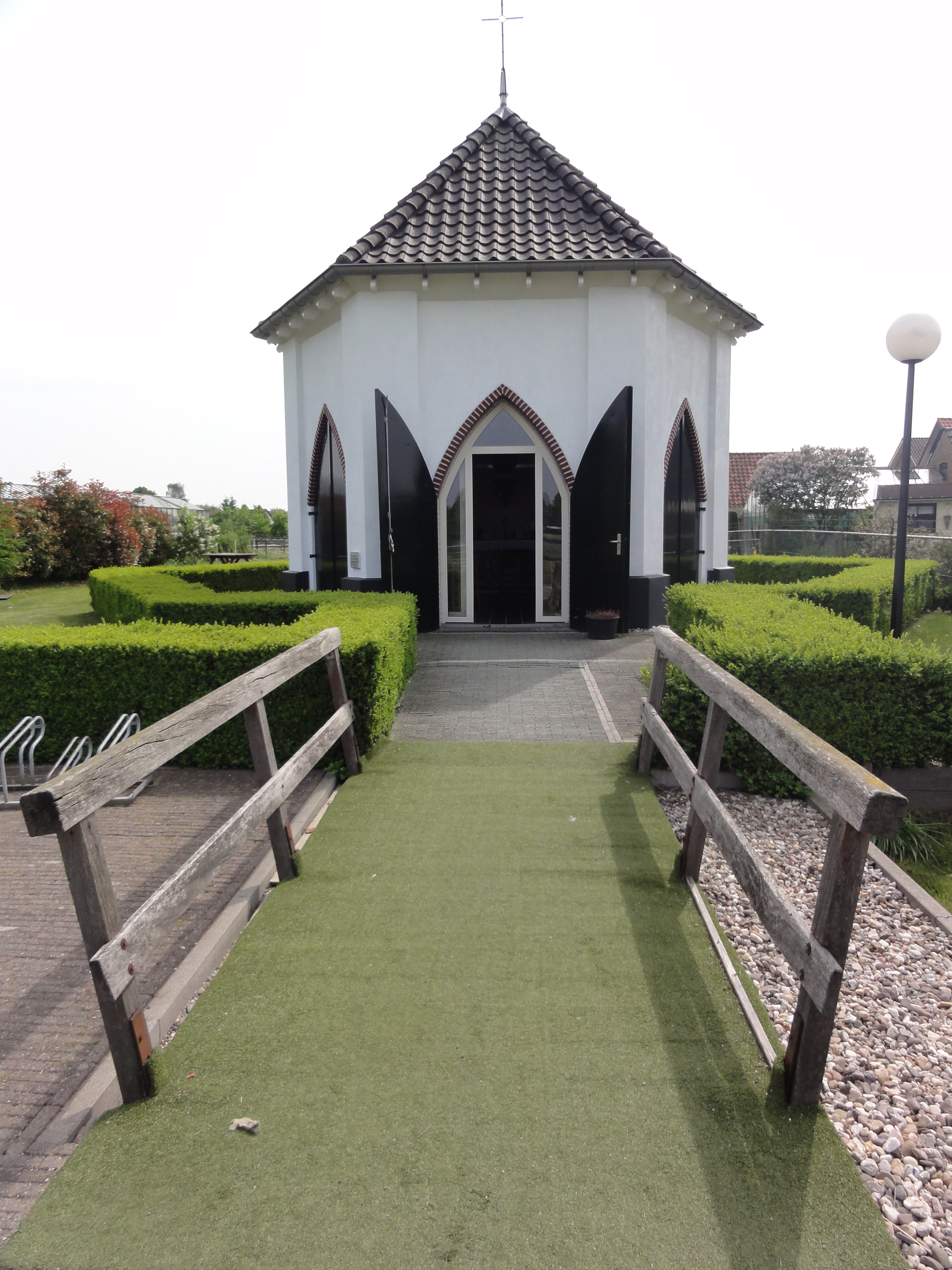
Mary Chapel
