= Ooij en Persingen =

Coordinates: 51°51′16″N 5°56′30″E

Ooij en Persingen is a former municipality in the Dutch province of Gelderland. It existed until 1818, when it was merged with Ubbergen.

It is named after the two villages Ooij and Persingen.
