= Dyle =

Dyle may refer to:

- Dyle (river), a river in central Belgium, tributary of the Rupel
- Dyle, Poland, a village
- Dyle plan, a French plan for defending against German invasion
- Dyle (department), a French department in present-day Belgium
- Mobile TV brand of a defunct (as of 2015) US TV service
