= Berg en Dal (municipality) =

- Municipality
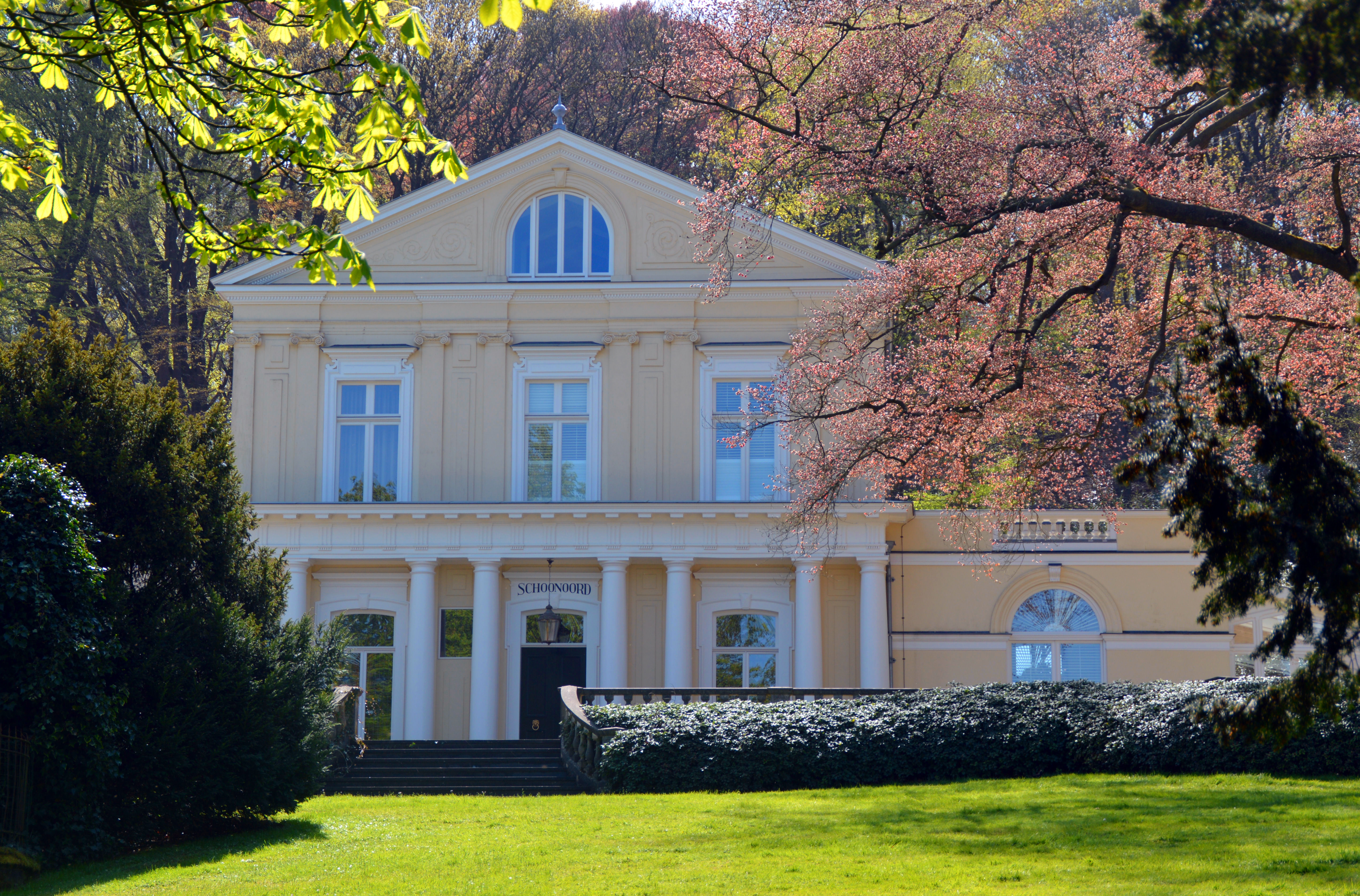
- Schoonoord estate

- Flag Coat of arms

- Location in Gelderland
- Coordinates: 51°47′N 5°56′E
- Country: Netherlands
- Province: Gelderland
- Established: 2015 (renamed in 2016)

Government
  - Body: Municipal council
  - Mayor: Mark Slinkman (CDA)

Area
  - Total: 93.28 km^{2} (36.02 sq mi)
  - Land: 86.31 km^{2} (33.32 sq mi)
  - Water: 6.97 km^{2} (2.69 sq mi)
- Elevation: 34 m (112 ft)

Population (January 2021)
  - Total: 35,010
  - Density: 406/km^{2} (1,050/sq mi)
- Time zone: UTC+1 (CET)
  - Summer (DST): UTC+2 (CEST)
- Postcode: 6560–6564, 6570–6572
- Area code: 024
- Website: www.bergendal.nl

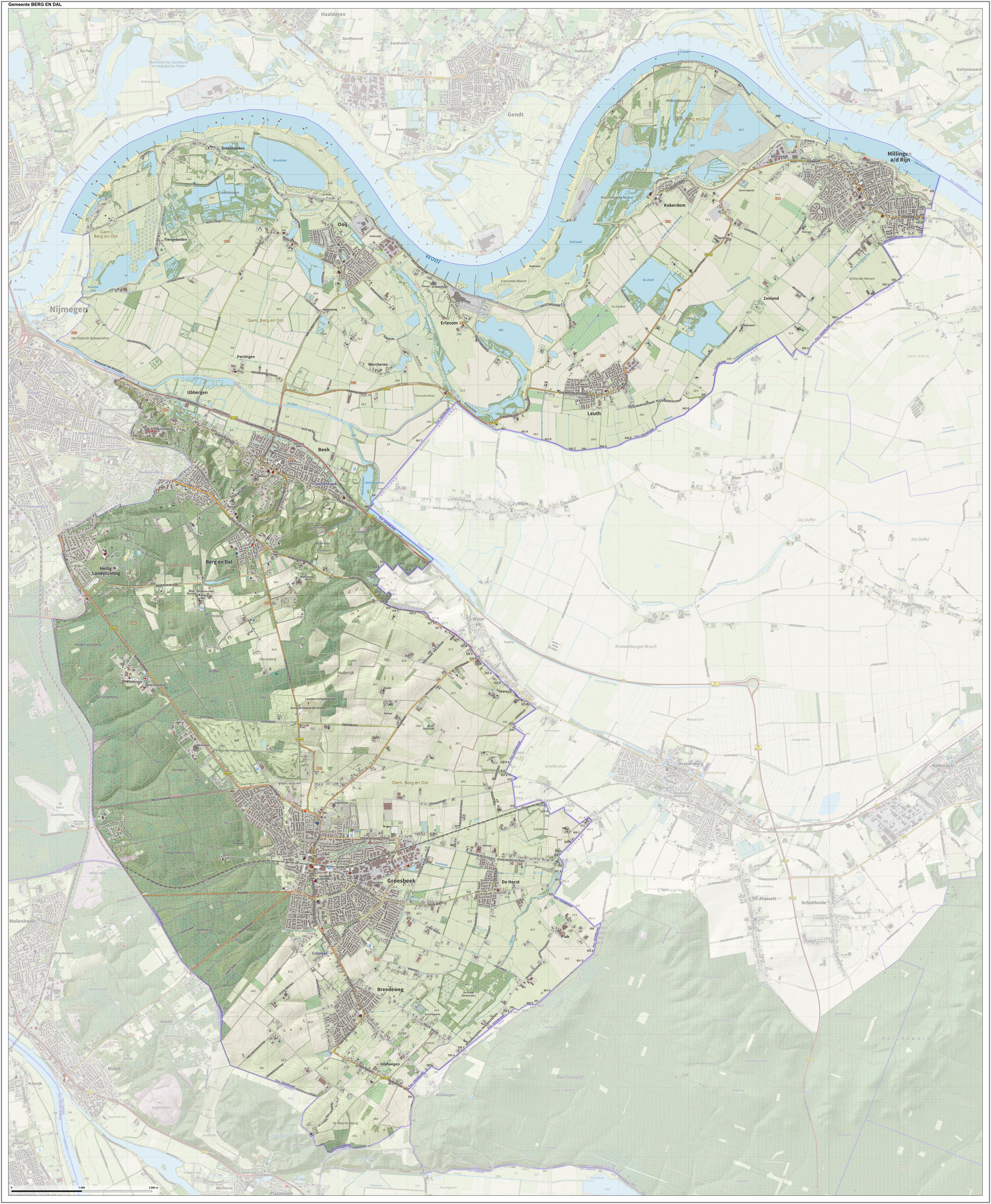
Map of the municipality of Berg en Dal

Berg en Dal (Dutch pronunciation: [ˌbɛrx ɛn ˈdɑl, - ən -]) is a municipality in the eastern Netherlands, in the province of Gelderland. It was formed through a merger of the municipalities of Groesbeek, Millingen aan de Rijn and Ubbergen in 2015. The resulting larger municipality maintained the name of Groesbeek until 2016, when it was renamed to Berg en Dal after the village of Berg en Dal.. The name literally translates to 'Mountain and Valley' in English.

Berg en Dal has about 34,714 inhabitants and covers an area of about 93 km². The municipality borders in the north on the Waal river and the Bijlands Kanaal, in the east on the German forest of the Reichswald, in the south on the province of Limburg, in the southwest on the forest of the Mookerheide (also Limburg), and in the west on the city of Nijmegen.

Berg en Dal is slightly hilly with altitudes reaching 75 meters at the Duivelsberg, a hill in the municipality.

The route of the International Four Days Marches Nijmegen goes through the municipality on the 3rd day (Day of Groesbeek).

== Population centres ==
- Beek
- Berg en Dal (village)
- Breedeweg
- Colonjes
- De Horst
- De Kamp
- De Vlietberg
- Erlecom
- Grafwegen
- Groenlanden
- Groesbeek
- Haukes
- Heikant
- Heilig Landstichting
- Holdeurn
- Kekerdom
- Leuth
- Meerwijk
- Millingen aan de Rijn
- Ooij
- Persingen
- Plak
- Tiengeboden
- Ubbergen
- Valkenlaagte
- Wercheren
- Wyler
- Zeeland

== Politics ==
The municipal council has 25 members. The 2026 election results were as follows:

- LOKAAL! – 7 seats
- GroenLinks / PvdA – 6 seats
- Kernachtig Groesbeek – 5 seats
- CDA – 3 seats
- D66 – 2 seats
- VVD – 2 seats

After the 2026 election, LOKAAL!, Kernachtig Groesbeek and D66 formed a coalition. The municipal executive consists of mayor Mark Slinkman (CDA) and four aldermen, drawn from the coalition parties.

== Notable people ==
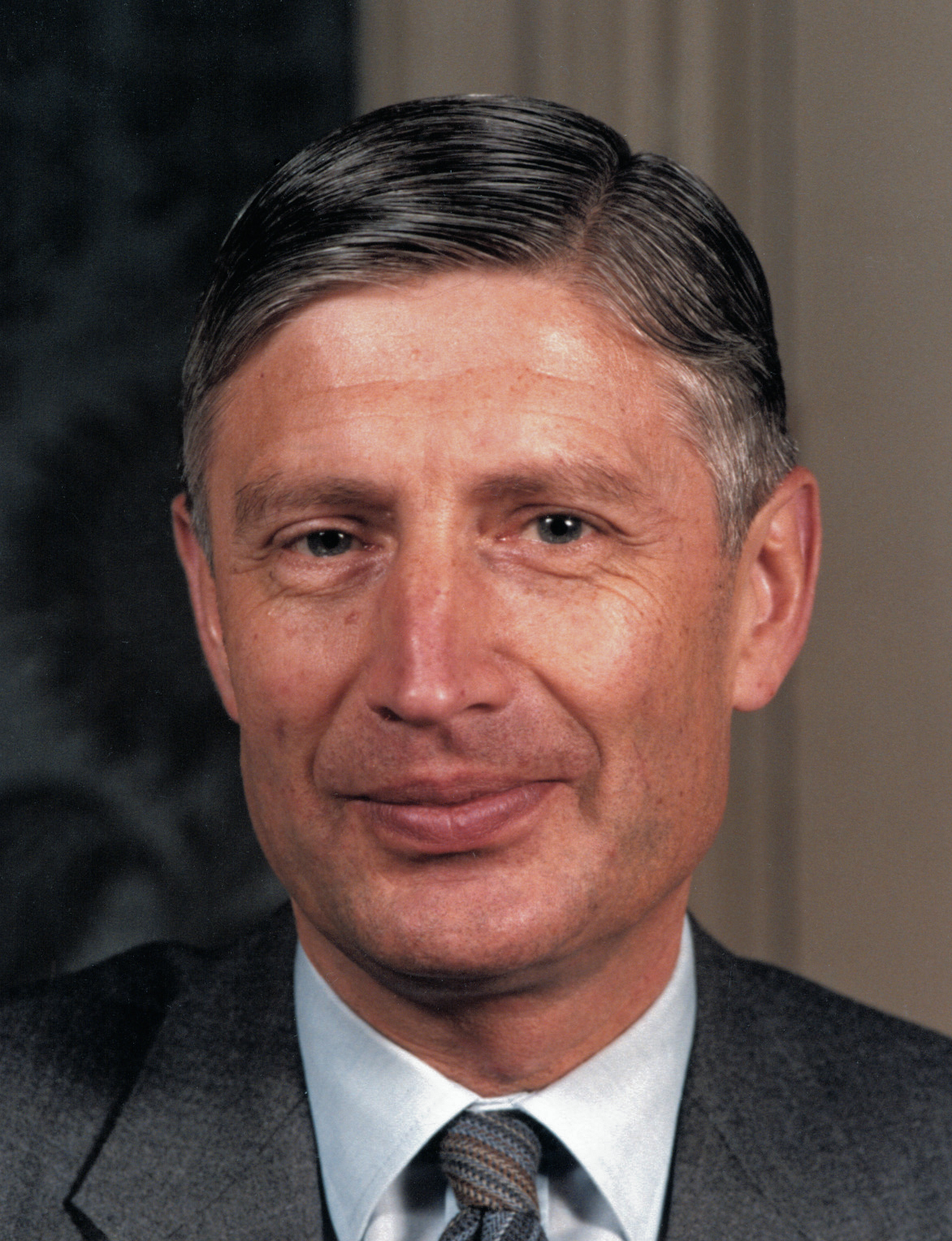
Dries van Agt, 1980

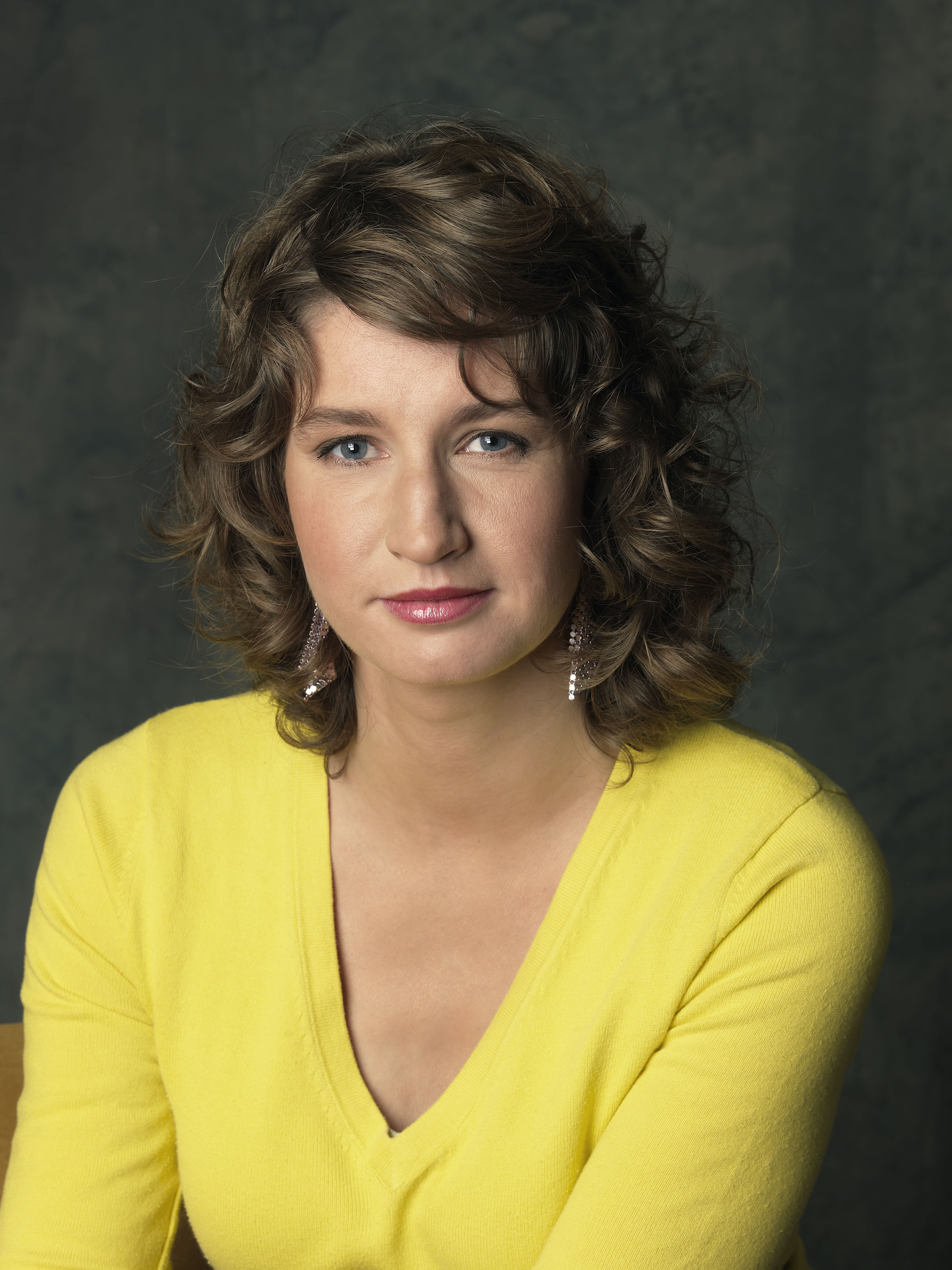
Sharon Gesthuizen, 2009

- Anthony Van Egmond (1778 in Groesbeek – 1838) a Dutch Napoleonic War veteran and settler in southwestern Ontario
- Sebastiaan Tromp (1889 in Beek – 1975) a Dutch Jesuit priest, theologian and Latinist
- Dries van Agt (1931 in Geldrop – 2024) a Dutch politician, Prime Minister of the Netherlands 1977 to 1982
- Baron Berend-Jan van Voorst tot Voorst (1944 in Beek – 2023) a Dutch politician, diplomat and jurist
- Constantijn Kortmann (1944 in Groesbeek – 2016) a Dutch professor of constitutional law
- Marie-Claire "Amber" Cremers (born 1969 in Ubbergen) a Dutch-born German singer/songwriter
- Sharon Gesthuizen (born 1976 in Nijmegen) a Dutch politician and trade unionist, grew up in Millingen aan de Rijn
- Bas Eickhout (born 1976 in Groesbeek) a Dutch politician and Member of the European Parliament

=== Sport ===
- Peter Arntz (born 1953 in Leuth) a Dutch retired football midfielder with 411 club caps
- Jan Peters (born 1954 in Groesbeek) a retired footballer with 380 club caps
- Reza Hormes-Ravenstijn (born 1967 in Beek) a Dutch cyclo-cross racer
- Yelmer Buurman (born 1987 in Ubbergen) a Dutch professional racing driver
- Jasper Cillessen (born 1989 in Nijmegen) a Dutch professional football goalkeeper, 52 caps for the Netherlands national football team, grew up in Groesbeek

== Gallery ==
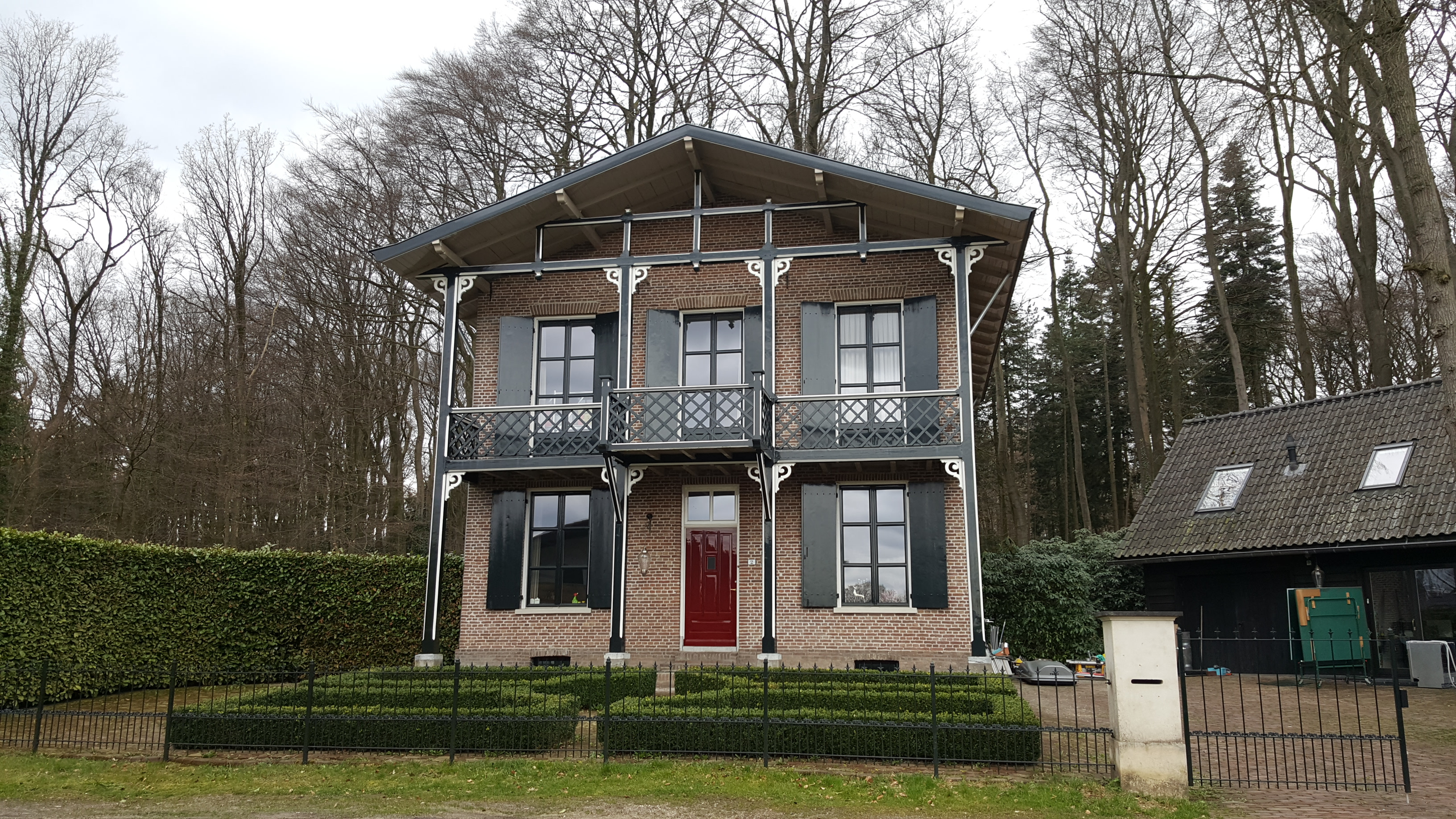
Knapheideweg, Groesbeek

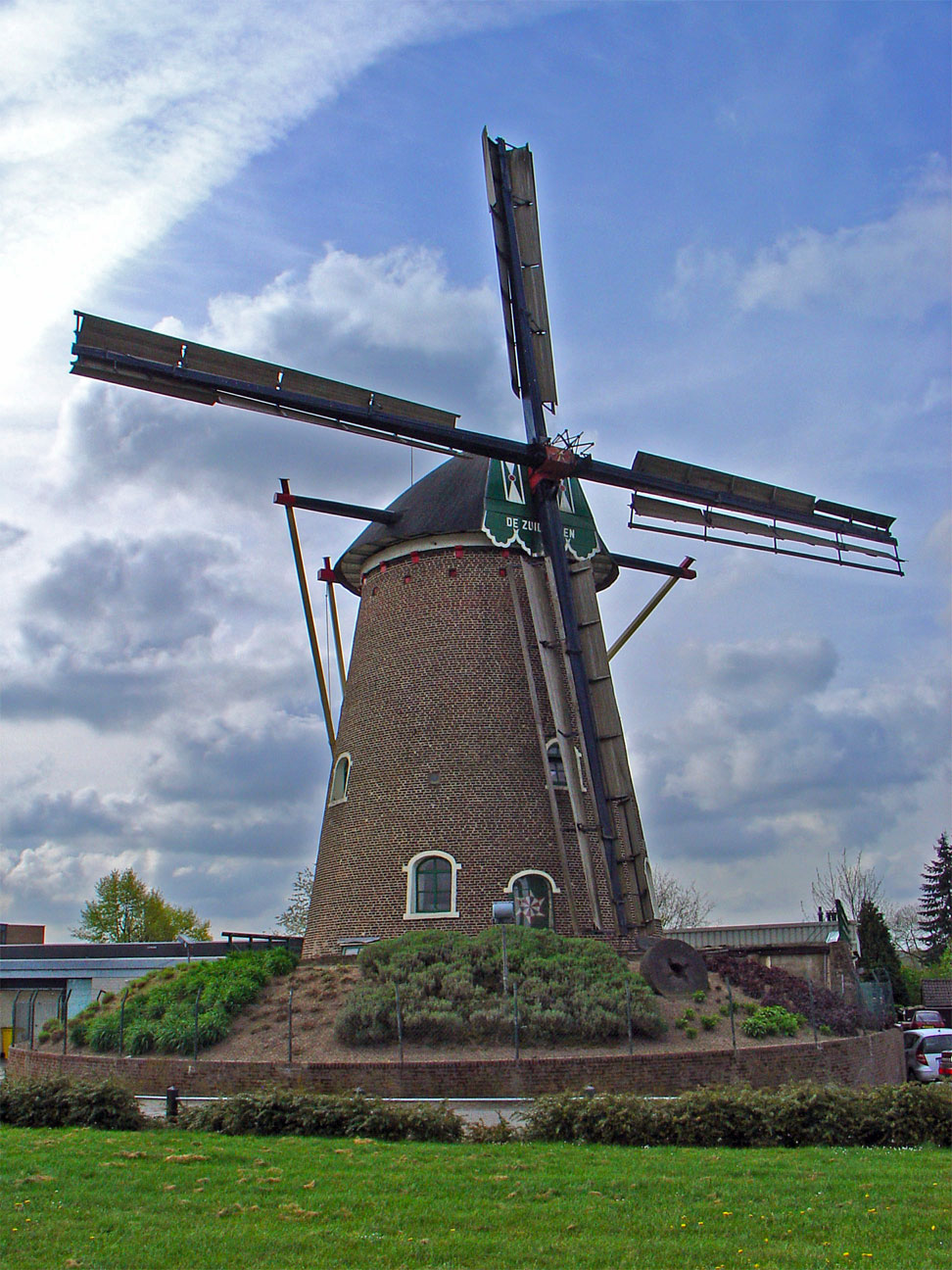
Zuidmolen Groesbeek

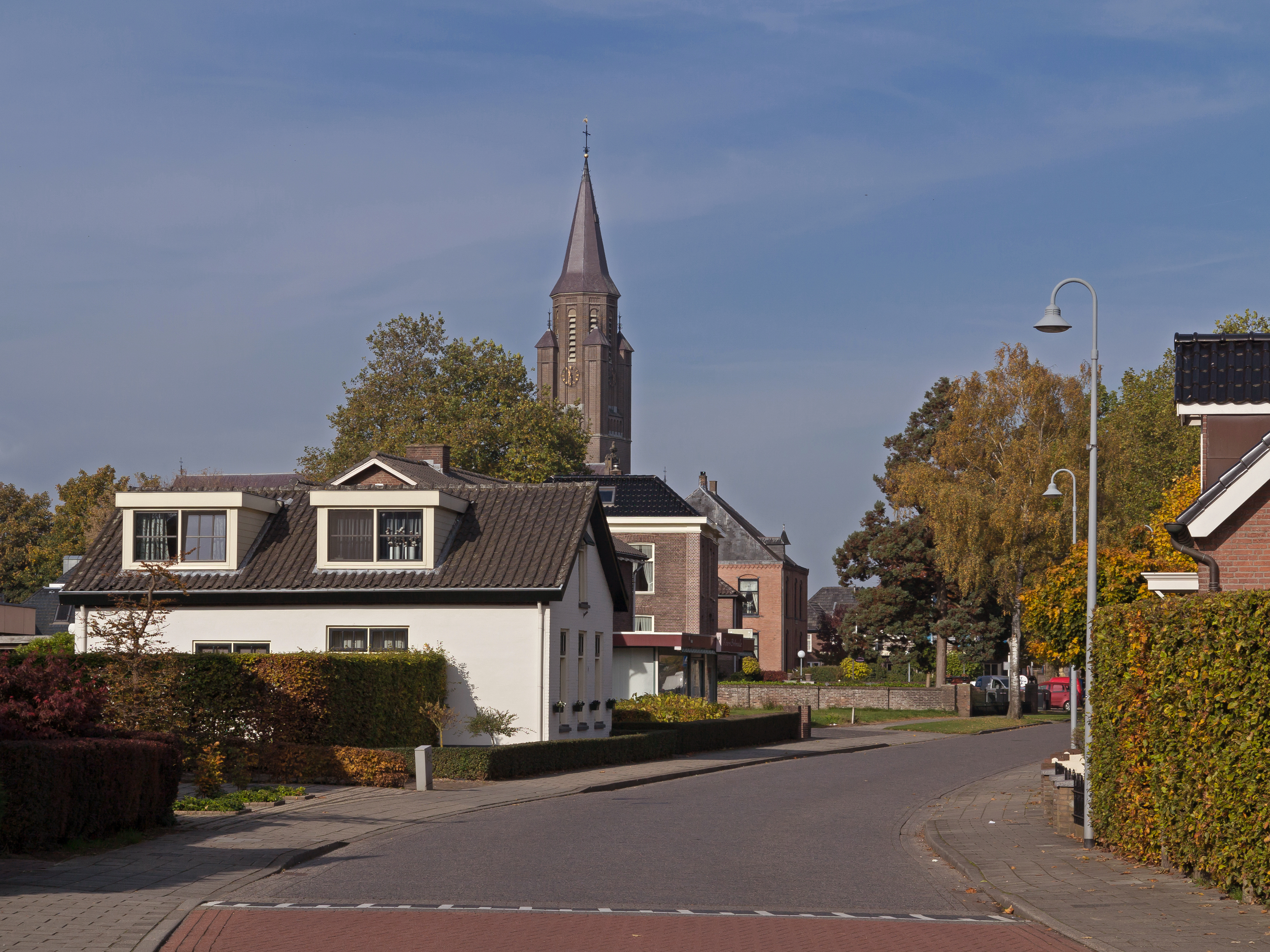
Millingen ad Rijn, tower of Sint-Antonius van Padua Church

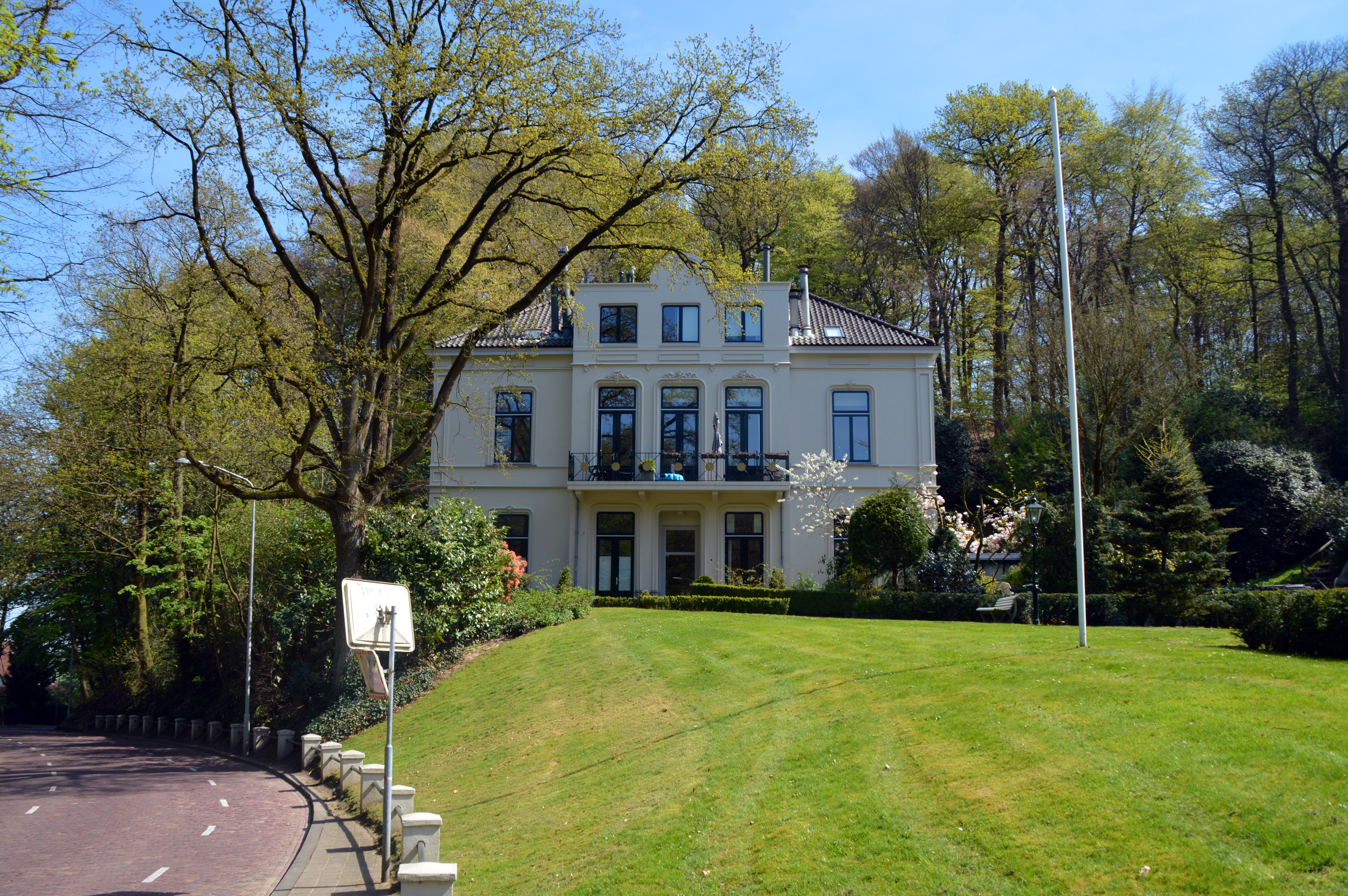
Heuvellust Rijksstraatweg, Ubbergen
