= Harry van Kuyk =

Dutch graphic artist, visual artist, graphic designer and writer

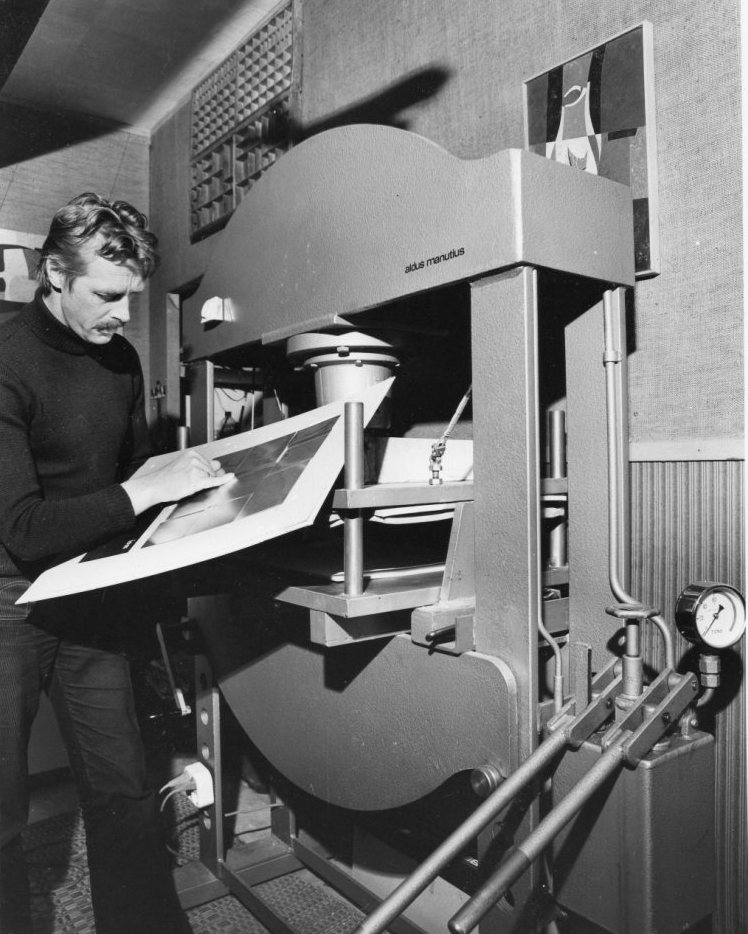
- Harry van Kuyk with a printing mould at his dedicated press Aldus Manutius for printed reliefs, Nijmegen 1973
- Born: Hendrikus Josephus van Kuijk; 2 March 1929, Zevenaar
- Died: 7 May 2008, Nijmegen
- Known for: Graphic artist, visual artist
- Movement: geometric, abstract, figurative
- Website: harryvankuyk.nl

Harry van Kuyk (Zevenaar, 2 March 1929 – Nijmegen, 7 May 2008) was a Dutch graphic artist, visual artist, graphic designer and writer. In 1969 he developed a new technique for the graphic arts, the printed relief or "relief print", a print with an extreme relief (subsequently coining a new Dutch term: reliëfdruk).

== Early life ==
In his teens, van Kuyk took up an apprenticeship at a small printer's in his hometown. It typified his enduring passion for graphic techniques and printing. He was trained at the Grafische School in Amsterdam (Amsterdam School of Printing and Graphics). Subsequently, he worked as a manual typesetter and a foreman at Boom-Ruygrok and Joh. Enschedé and as a graphic designer and a lay-out editor at the Nijmegen magazine division of the newspaper De Gelderlander. Meanwhile, he drew, painted and photographed, produced graphic art at a small scale, and mastered graphic design. In his spare time he carried out artistic and commercial designs commissioned by companies, the local government and private collectors.

== Graphics and printing career ==
In 1965, he became an independent graphic designer and set up a studio in Bemmel. He participated in regional exhibitions with figurative graphic art and drawings, and made contacts with painters, sculptors and graphic artists like Theo Elfrink, Klaas Gubbels, Rob Terwindt, Oscar Goedhart, Ed van Teeseling and with the artist-critic Maarten Beks.

In 1969, he managed to produce prints with an extreme relief (up to 20 millimetres) in special thick rag paper. Initially, he referred to them as "präge prints" (based on the German word for blind embossing), at that time a common term in modern graphic art. Given a number of essential technical differences he soon coined and permanently used the Dutch term reliëfdruk ("relief print", meaning print with extreme relief).

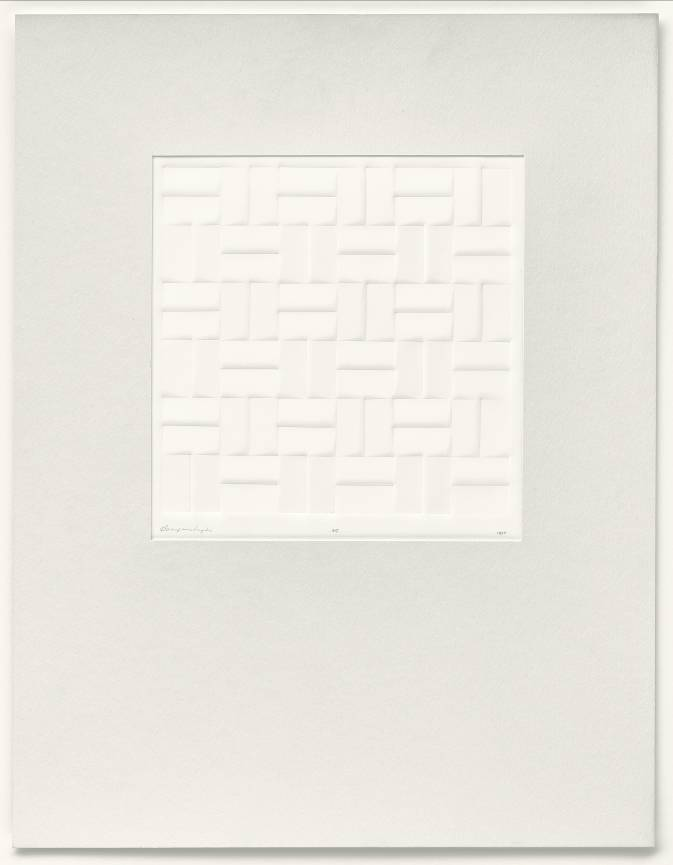
Printed relief (two rectangles per square, 6 columns x 6 rows) 1970 paper 65 x 50 cm (passe-partout size) edition 7

His white, geometric-abstract prints, characterized by light and shadow, were a great success from 1970 onwards. One is inclined to compare them with the white wall reliefs and objects by Ad Dekkers and Nul-artist Jan Schoonhoven (Nul was closely related to the German group Zero). "The most obvious interpretation of the Harry van Kuyk sheets relates them to Nul", art critic Lambert Tegenbosch wrote in 1972. "There is the same preference of white. Often there is some form of serial production. There is the picturesque definition of geometry. There is an element of mystery evoked by emptiness." In the early 1970s, artists like Schoonhoven and Shlomo Koren created their own embossed versions of white, geometric series.

In 1971, van Kuyk, supported by substantial state financial funding, built his large dedicated reliëfdruk press, Aldus Manutius. He used it to print large size, coherent series covering specific themes: geometry, typography, the golden section. He organized the printed reliefs in clamshell boxes, portfolios, wooden boxes and artist's books like Aldus Manutius (1971), Variaties op de Sectio Aurea (1972), Groot Abecedarium (1973), Tangram (1975) and Landschap (1980). He provided the editions with text booklets or sheets of text containing introductions and essays by art connoisseurs and journalists (Lambert Tegenbosch, G.W. Ovink, Joop Eilander, Wim Wennekes) or with poetry (by Hans Sternsdorff – also known as Hans Ruf jr. – and Hans Bouma). In addition, he produced numerous individual printed reliefs with geometric, lyrical-abstract and figurative shapes. The editions were small: seven, ten or twenty copies and, very occasionally, sixty. The production was quite time consuming. On his own initiative, he executed a number of his geometric printed reliefs in large white wall reliefs in wood (1973, 1975).

Over one hundred exhibitions at home and abroad followed (Amsterdam, Rotterdam, London, New York). A number of sales exhibitions were completely sold out within only a few weeks. National and international museums acquired his work. The Groot Abecedarium was awarded Silver at the Third International Graphic Arts Biennial in Frechen, West Germany, in 1974. He moved his studio to Nijmegen. In 1980-1981, he was the contemporary arts guest reviewer for De Gelderlander newspaper.

After a 5-month journey across Africa (1982-1983) he settled in Ooij. His production decreased, as well as the number of his exhibitions. However, new reliëfdruk editions and artist's books appeared, including Bodoni Initiales (1993), Erografica (1995) and Novanu (2006). He produced large, minimalist white wall reliefs in acrylic or wood commissioned by, amongst others, the municipality of Zevenaar for its town hall (1985).

From the 1990s onwards, he devoted himself to the more classical graphic art forms such as drypoint (nudes), and to drawings, gouaches and pastels (nudes, landscapes). He wrote essays and poetry for his artist publications. He published a dozen collections of stories, travel stories and aphorisms. In 2007, he was appointed a Knight of the Order of Oranje-Nassau. He died one year later in Nijmegen.

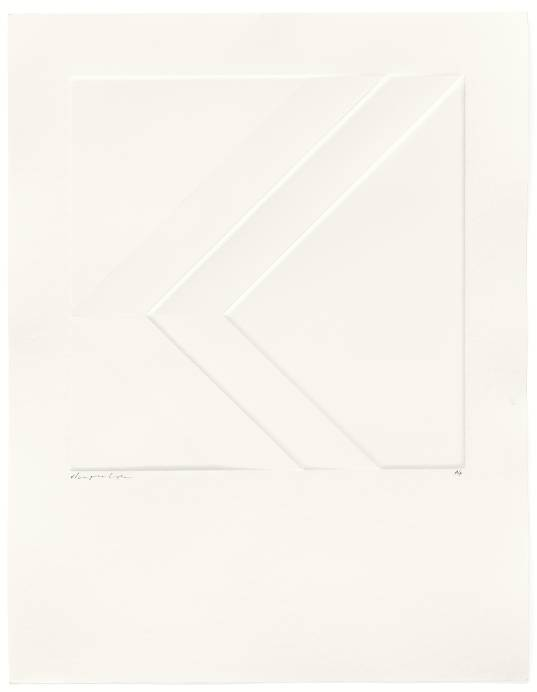
Printed relief from Groot Abecedarium (letter K) 1973 paper 65 x 50 cm (sheet dimensions) edition 60

== Relief print: printed relief ==
A printed relief (reliëfdruk) by Van Kuyk is often mistaken for an extreme type of blind embossing. However, this is incorrect as the techniques differ. Embossing is a print without the use of ink with some relief (up to a few millimetres), produced on a platen press (for relief printing) or an etching press (for gravure or intaglio printing). In a platen press, two platens are pressed against each other in one blow and with force, so as to have the template create a relief in the paper. In an etching press the template and the paper are fed simultaneously under a cylinder horizontally and smoothly, so as to have the template press the relief into the paper.

A printed relief or ‘reliëfdruk’ is a print (without the use of ink) with an extreme relief (5 to 20 millimetres), produced on a dedicated reliëfdruk press (special embossing press) by means of a mould or die and counter-die (felt mats). A printed relief by van Kuyk combines relief and intaglio or gravure printing: the relief sits both in and on the paper. Van Kuyk's special embossing press operates vertically: the print mould or die (manually composed with elements of zinc, steel or aluminum), a sheet of moist, thick, long-fibred paper together with a set of felt mats are stacked between two plates (stamps). Under high, hydraulic pressure (up to 60 tons), with constant heat (up to 70 °C), over one to two hours, an image with an extreme relief is formed. The reliëfdruk mould is meticulously constructed with smooth raised (convex) and recessed (concave) segments so as avoid tearing the print paper. A reliëfdruk or printed relief is the outcome of a delicate balance between mould, choice of paper, pressure, temperature and time.

The process designed by van Kuyk does not derive from embossing, but from stereotype. In its modern version stereotype was a commonly used early 20th century production technique in the commercial printing trade. Stereotype (stereos = solid; typos = stamp, letter) is the method in which a well-defined mirror image copy of a page of lead type is pressed into special paper board under vertical, hydraulic pressure in a heated embossing press. The paper board print mould (die) is subsequently cast in lead which results in a new printable page ("stype" in printers' jargon) identical to the original lead type. In this way exact replicas of the same page can be used simultaneously on a number of presses. This in turn facilitates high volume printing in a short time frame – a profitable way of printing newspapers, magazines and bestselling books. Around 1960, stereotype vanished due to the rise of offset printing; offset uses photography as a reproduction technique and made lead type obsolete.

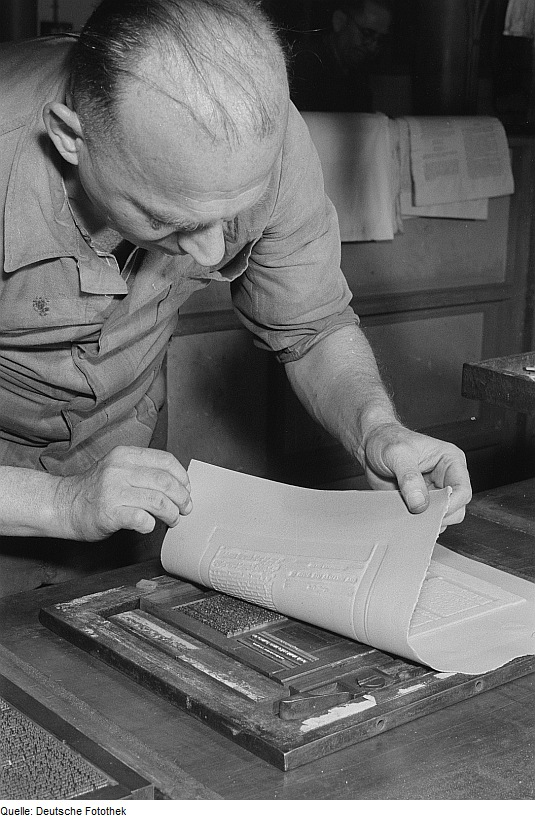
Stereotype: type and mirror image copy (paper board die) Reclam-Verlag, Leipzig 1953 Photo: Roger en Renate Rössing Deutsche Fotothek

Due to his years of experience in large commercial printing companies, van Kuyk knew the stereotype technique inside out. As a pioneer he translated the technique to the graphic arts in 1969. In the 1970s, various artists (Klaus van de Locht, Torkel Dahlstedt) mastered the process in his studio, at the press. However, whereas embossing and other graphic art with relief maintained their popularity, it is rare to find prints with an extreme relief (reliëfdruk), due to the specialized skills required.

== Own work ==
=== Graphic works: editions and artist's books ===
- Aldus Manutius, 1971 (printed reliefs in wooden box)
- Variaties op de Sectio Aurea, 1972 (printed reliefs in clamshell box)
- Groot Abecedarium, 1973 (printed reliefs and screen prints in two clamshell boxes and portfolio, all in wooden box)
- Tangram, 1975 (printed reliefs and screen prints in clamshell box)
- Grafinu, 1976 (screen prints in portfolio)
- Landschap, 1980 (printed reliefs in artist's book)
- Cijfers, 1988 (printed reliefs in artist's book)
- Bodoni Initiales, 1993 (printed reliefs in three clamshell boxes in wooden box)
- Erografica, 1995 (printed reliefs in artist's book)
- Nymph, 1996 (screen prints in artist's book)
- Horizontaal. Liefdesbrieven aan een polder, 1999 (offset in artist's book)
- Gratie, 2001 (screen prints in cardboard wrapper)
- Novanu, 2006 (gridless litho in artist's book)

=== Commissioned monumental art ===
- Linoleum wall inlay, 1966, paint mill Mechelen-aan-de-Maas (entrance, 210 x 420 cm, location unknown)
- Linoleum wall inlay, 1967, Twickel College Delden (stairwell, 120 x 285 cm)
- Acrylic wall relief, 1985, town hall of Zevenaar (wedding hall, 82 x 640 cm, in 2016 relocated to the entrance of the new town hall)
- Wooden wall relief, 1988, Economische School ’s-Hertogenbosch (auditorium, 140 x 2400 cm, in 1997 dismantled and destroyed)
- Education monument in granite, 1991, Pettelaarpark ’s-Hertogenbosch (480 x 500 x 75 cm)
- Three wooden wall reliefs, 1998, Bouwbeurs Breda (114 x 70 x 6 cm each)
- Wall panorama in silk screen on steel and wood, 2001, former Rabobank Beek-Ubbergen (entrance, 80 x 1750 x 15 cm)

=== Books ===
- Gisteren. Legaat van vierentwintig uur, 1990 (stories)
- Kerstmisser, 1996 (novella)
- Solo, 1998 (columns)
- Kunstenaarsgoed, 2002 (aphorisms)
- Kerstmis in Lomé, 2004-2005 (novella)
- Re-Genesis, 2007 (essay)

=== In public collections ===
- Rijksmuseum Print Collection, Amsterdam
- Stedelijk Museum, Amsterdam
- Stedelijk Museum, Schiedam
- Art Museum, The Hague
- Museum Meermanno | House of Books, The Hague
- Royal Library, The Hague
- Museum Boijmans Van Beuningen, Rotterdam
- Museum of Modern Art, Arnhem
- Museum Het Valkhof, Nijmegen
- Centraal Museum, Utrecht
- Museum Voorlinden, Wassenaar
- Cultural Heritage Agency (Ministry of Education, Culture, Science), Rijswijk / Amersfoort
- Pretoria Art Museum, Pretoria, South Africa
- University Gallery, University of Florida, Gainesville, United States
