= Millingen aan de Rijn =

- Town and former municipality
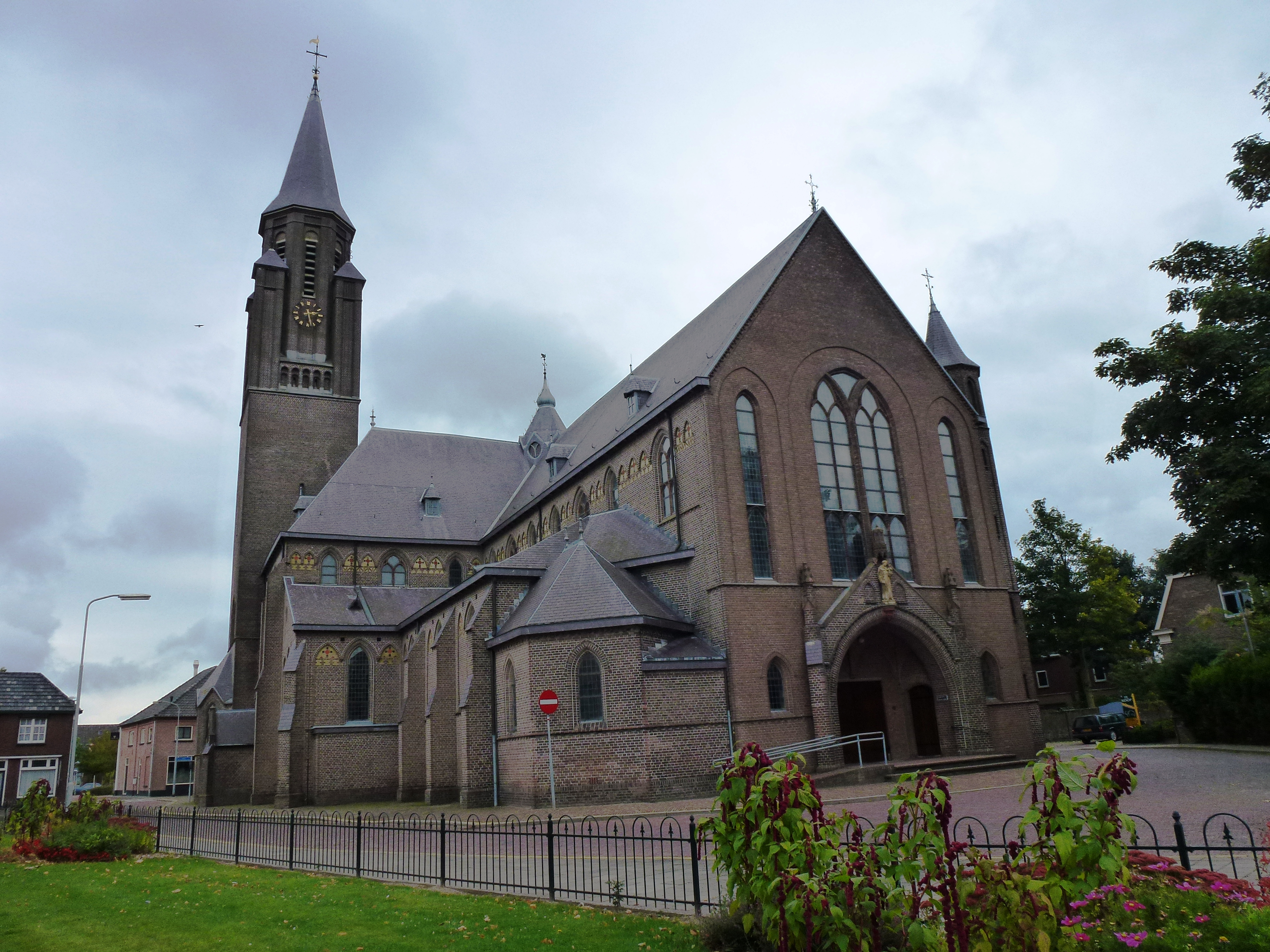
- Church in Millingen aan de Rijn

- Flag Coat of arms

- Location in Gelderland
- Coordinates: 51°52′N 6°3′E
- Country: Netherlands
- Province: Gelderland
- Municipality: Berg en Dal

Area
  - Total: 10.27 km^{2} (3.97 sq mi)
  - Land: 8.66 km^{2} (3.34 sq mi)
  - Water: 1.61 km^{2} (0.62 sq mi)
- Elevation: 13 m (43 ft)

Population (August 2017)
  - Total: 5,918
- Time zone: UTC+1 (CET)
  - Summer (DST): UTC+2 (CEST)
- Postcode: 6566
- Area code: 0481

Millingen aan de Rijn (Dutch pronunciation: [ˈmɪlɪŋən aːn də ˈrɛin] or [-ŋə ʔaːn -]) is a former municipality and a town in the eastern Netherlands, on the border with Germany. It merged into the enlarged municipality of Groesbeek on 1 January 2015, renamed Berg en Dal from 1 January 2016.

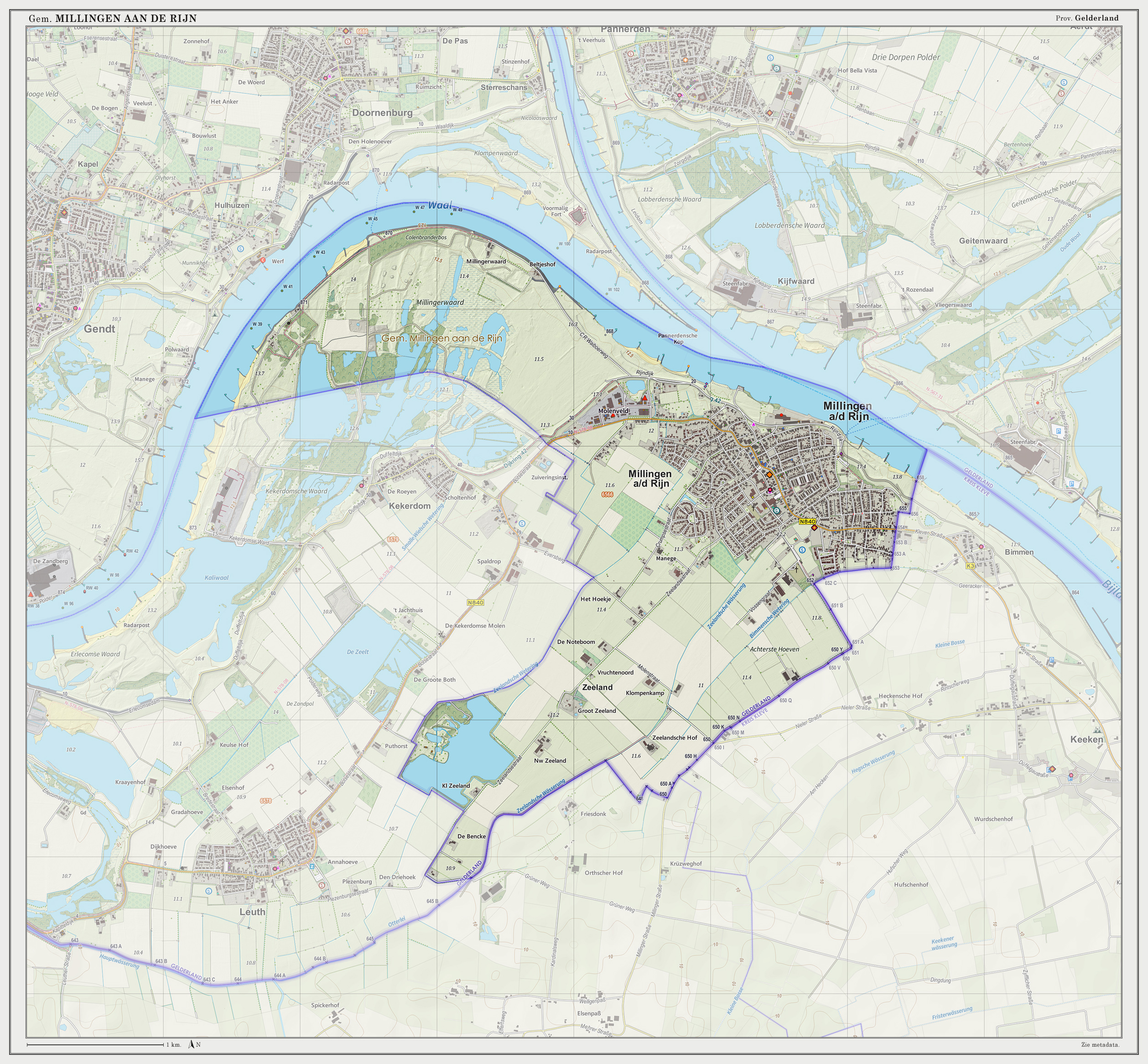
Map of former Millingen aan de Rijn municipality, 2014

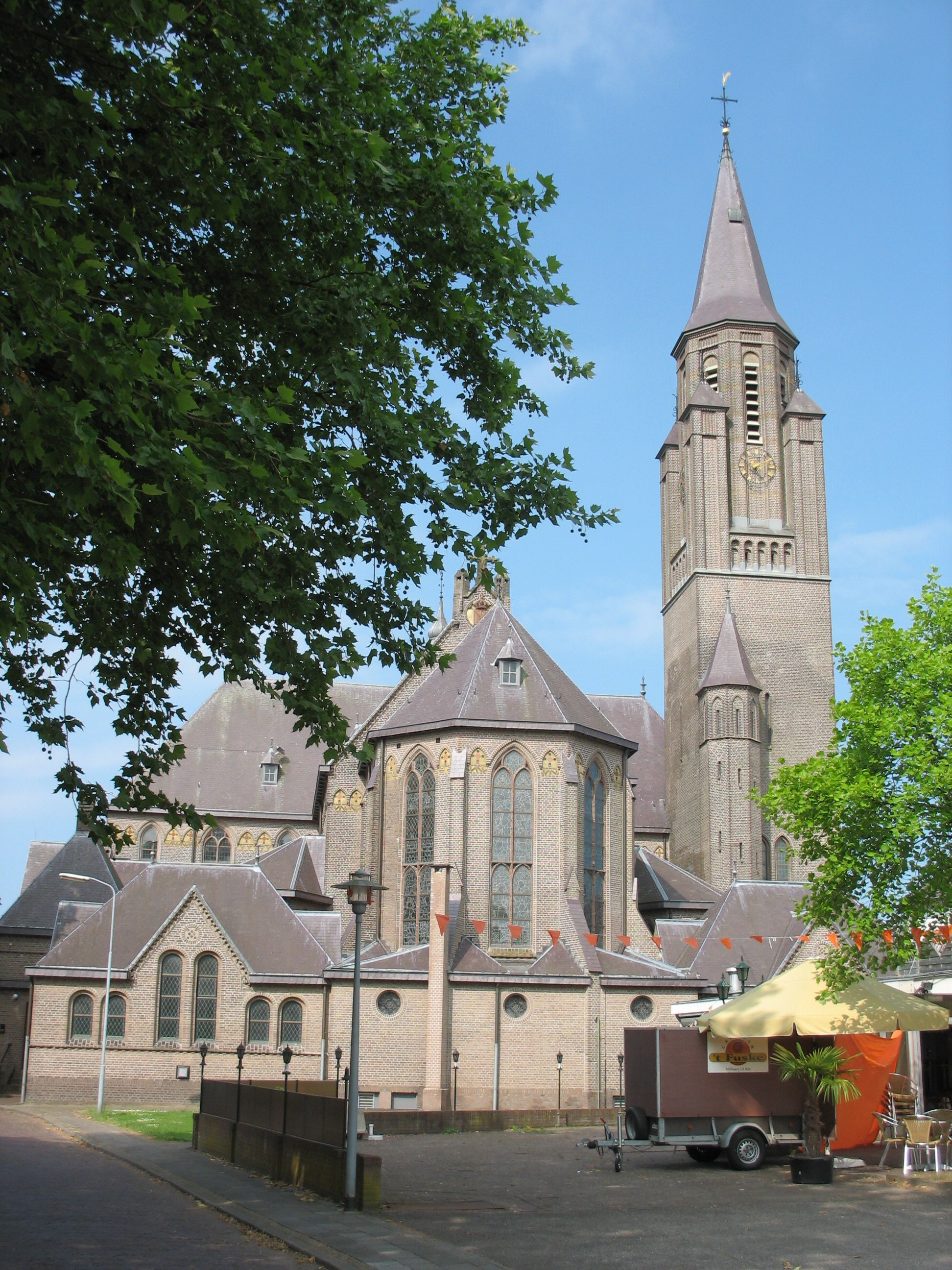
Sint Antonius Church
