= Erlecom =

- Hamlet
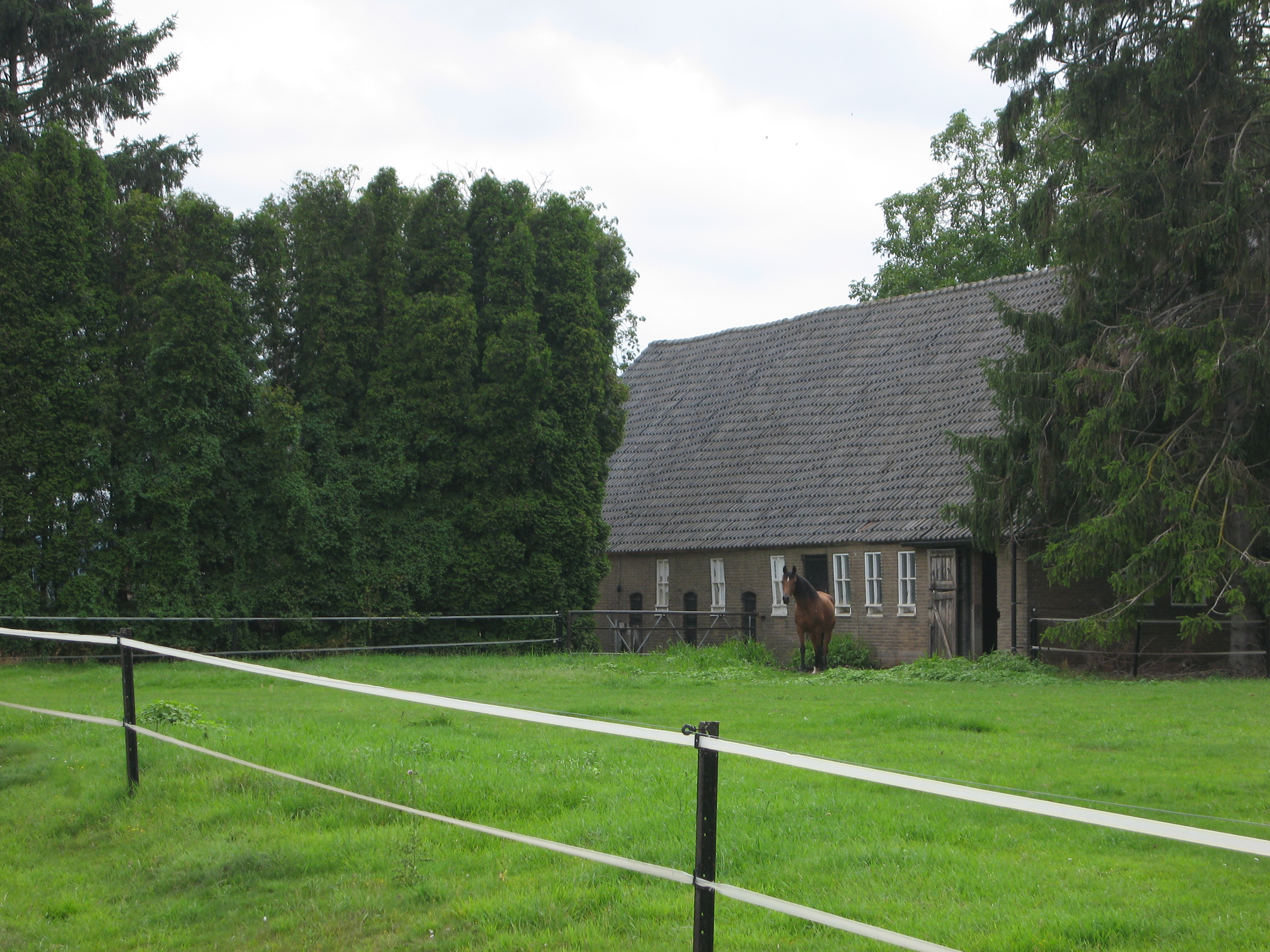
- Farm in Erlecom

- Location in the province of Gelderland Erlecom (Netherlands)
- Coordinates: 51°51′07″N 5°57′42″E
- Country: Netherlands
- Province: Gelderland
- Municipality: Berg en Dal

Area
  - Total: 3.66 km^{2} (1.41 sq mi)
- Elevation: 13 m (43 ft)

Population (2021)
  - Total: 150
  - Density: 41/km^{2} (110/sq mi)
- Time zone: UTC+1 (CET)
  - Summer (DST): UTC+2 (CEST)
- Postal code: 6577
- Dialing code: 024

Erlecom (Dutch pronunciation: [ˈɛrləkɔm]) is a hamlet in the Dutch municipality of Berg en Dal, in the province of Gelderland.

Erlecom was first mentioned between 800 and 850 as Adelrichheim, and means "settlement of Adelrik". Erlecom was a heerlijkheid until the French period (1806). The castle De Kleverburg was first mentioned in 1343, and disappeared in a flood in the late-18th century. There were brickworks in Erlecom during the 19th century. In 1840, it was home to 202 people.

== Gallery ==
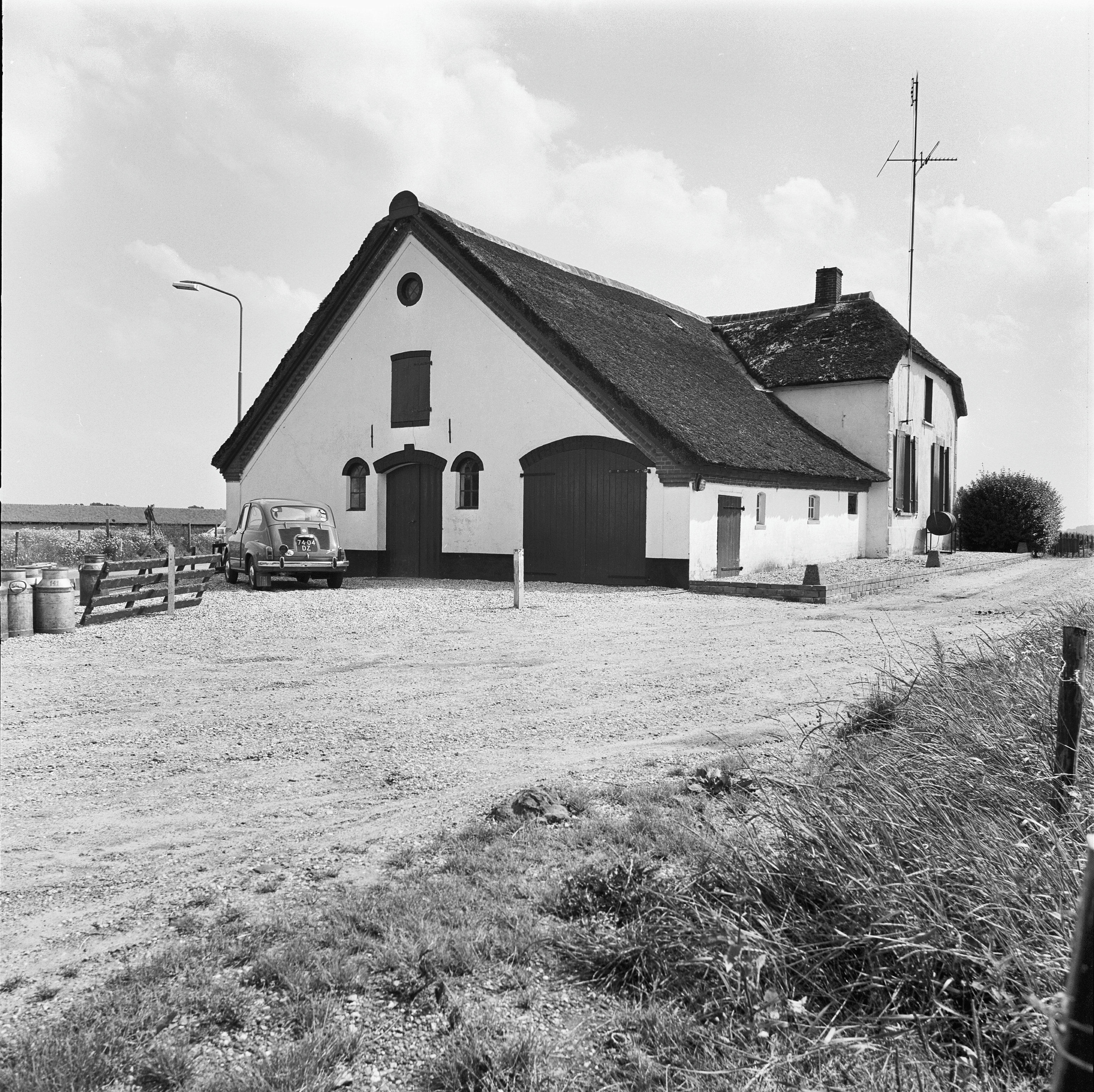
Farm in Erlecom

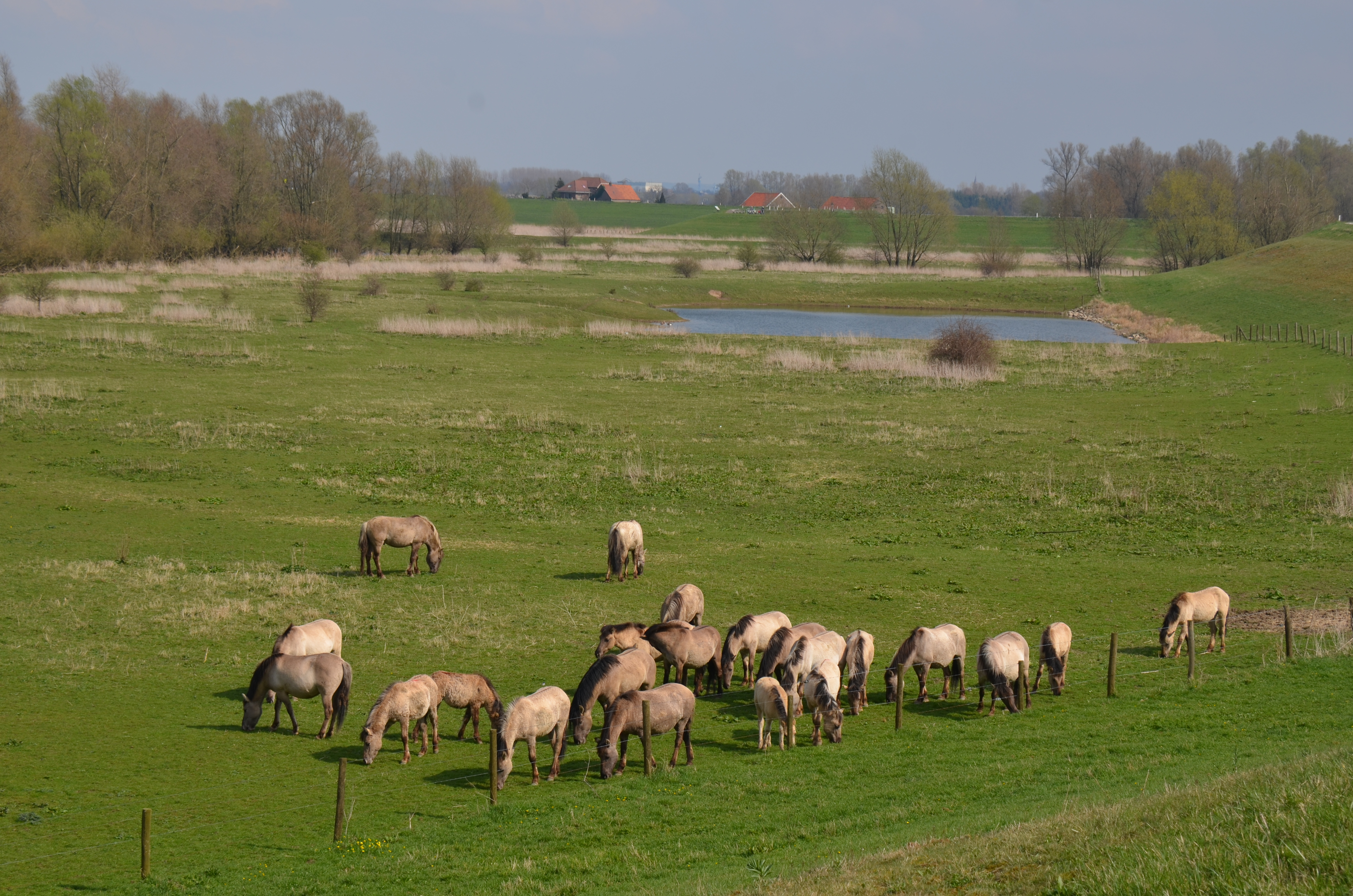
Konik horses near the Waal

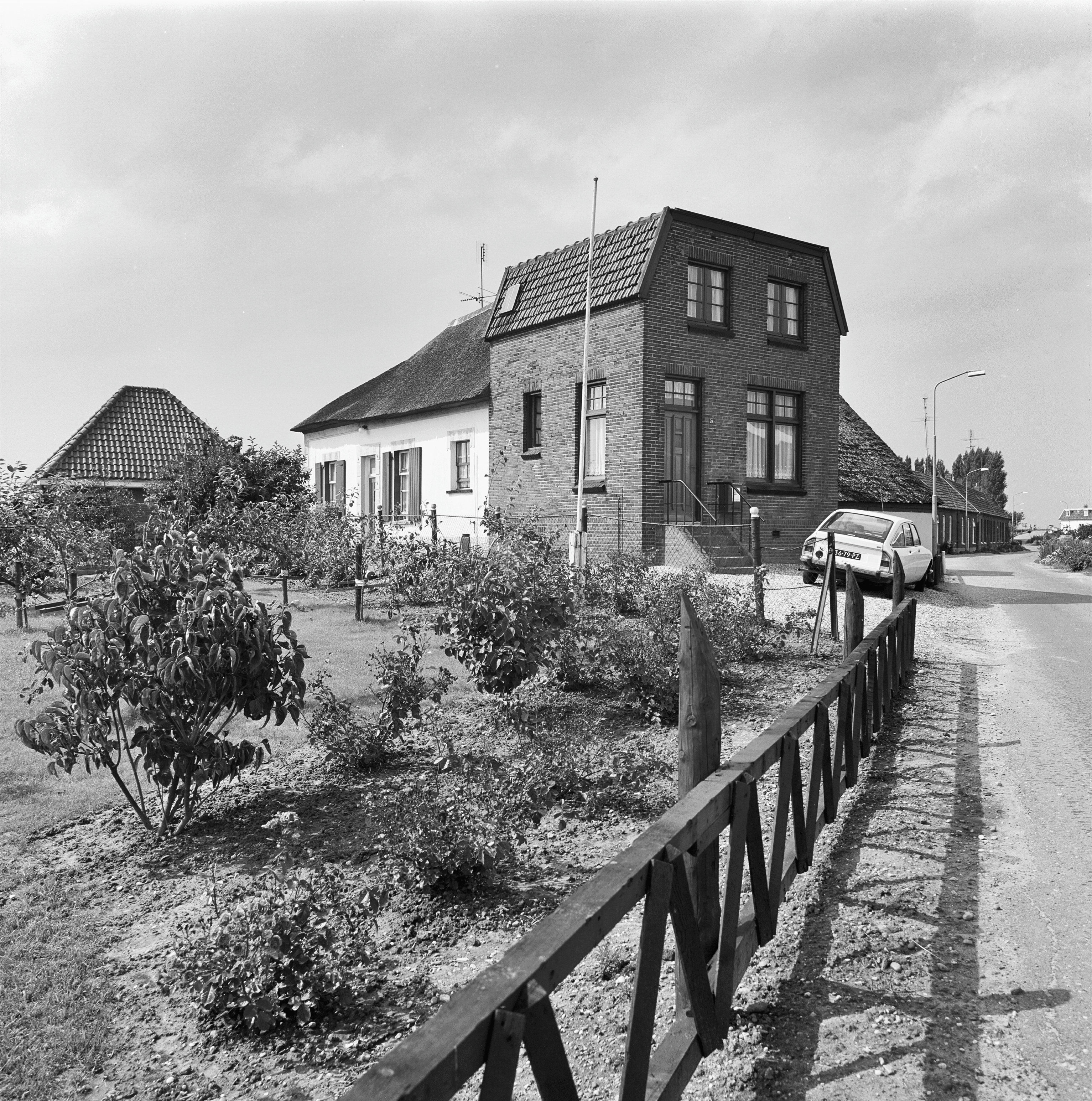
House in Erlecom
