= Persingen =

- Village
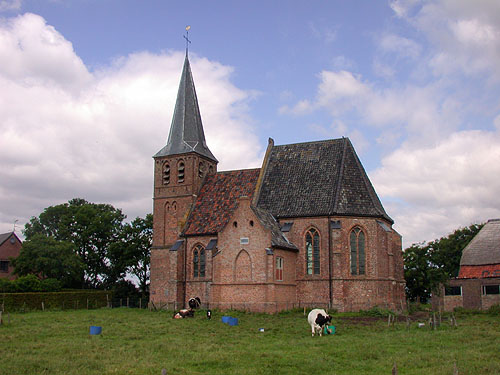
- Church of Persingen

- Location in the province of Gelderland Persingen (Netherlands)
- Coordinates: 51°51′N 5°55′E
- Country: Netherlands
- Province: Gelderland
- Municipality: Berg en Dal

Area
  - Total: 3.93 km^{2} (1.52 sq mi)
- Elevation: 13 m (43 ft)

Population (2021)
  - Total: 105
  - Density: 26.7/km^{2} (69.2/sq mi)
- Time zone: UTC+1 (CET)
  - Summer (DST): UTC+2 (CEST)
- Postal code: 6575
- Dialing code: 0524

Persingen (Dutch pronunciation: [ˈpɛrsɪŋə(n)]) is a village situated in the municipality of Berg en Dal in the province of Gelderland. In 2021, Persingen had 105 inhabitants. The village claims to be the smallest village of the Netherlands for tourist reasons, however there are many more contestants who are much smaller; the former island of Schokland and the former squatter village of Ruigoord have the best credentials.

== History ==
It was first mentioned in the 13th century as Persingen, and means "settlement of the people of Perso (person)". In the 13th century, a chapel was built at Persingen, and in the 15th century, it was replaced by a church. In 1444, the castle "Huys Persingen" was first mentioned. In 1526, it was destroyed by the citizens of Nijmegen. It was rebuilt in 1529, and was set on fire in 1613, and only a ruin remained. The last traces were destroyed in a 1809 flood. Up to 1818, the village was part of the Kingdom of Prussia. In 1840, it was home to 24 people.

== Gallery ==
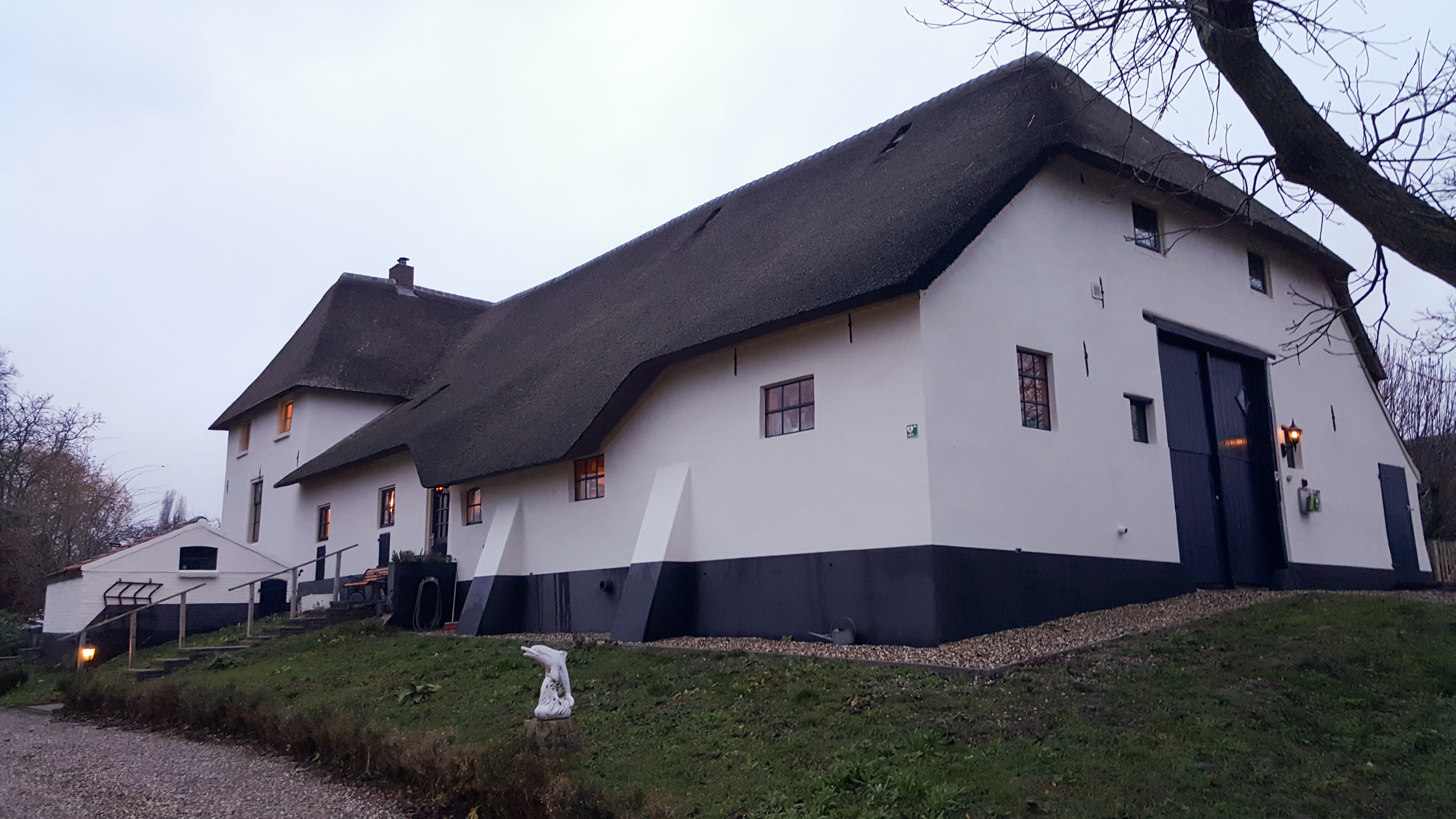
Farm in Persingen

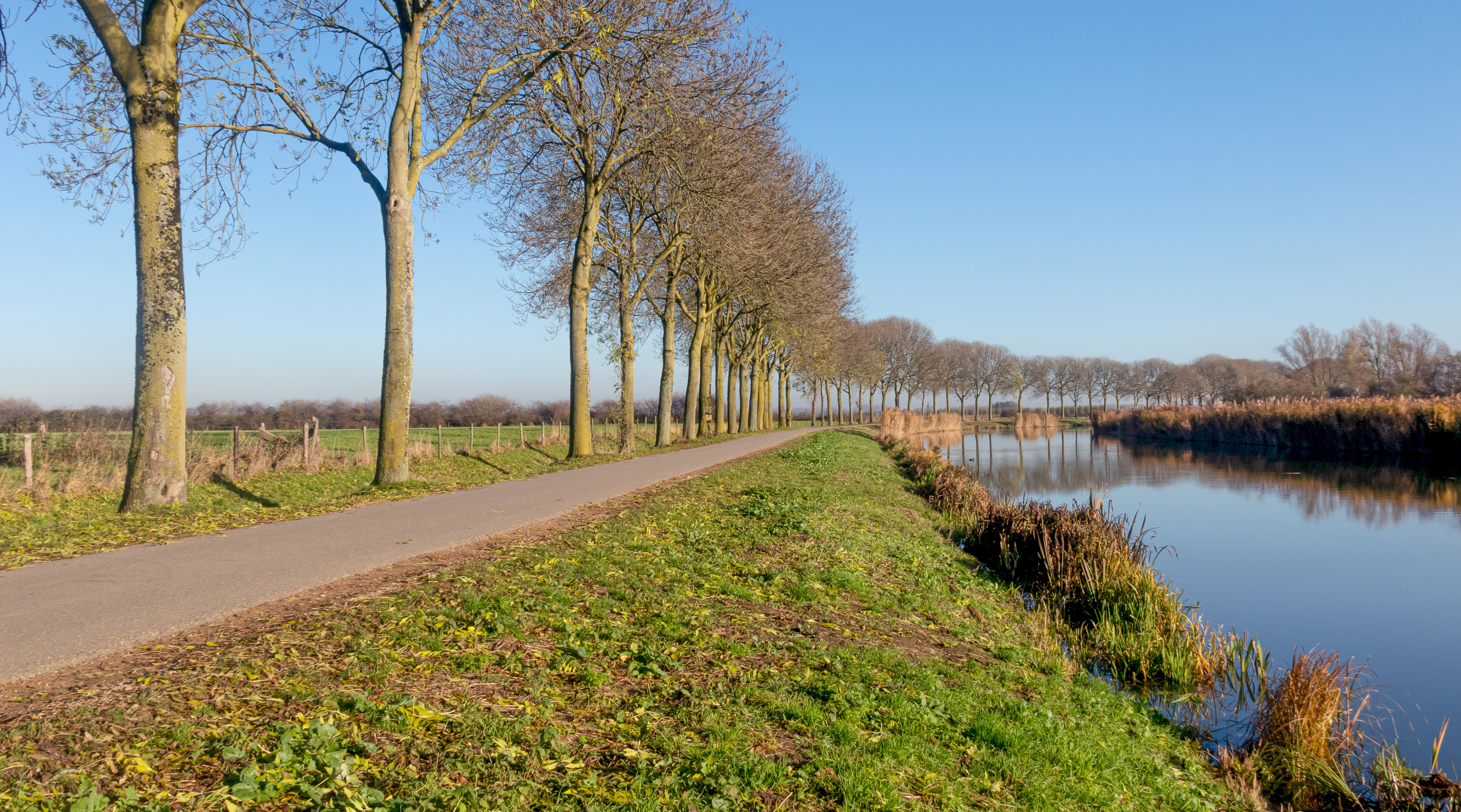

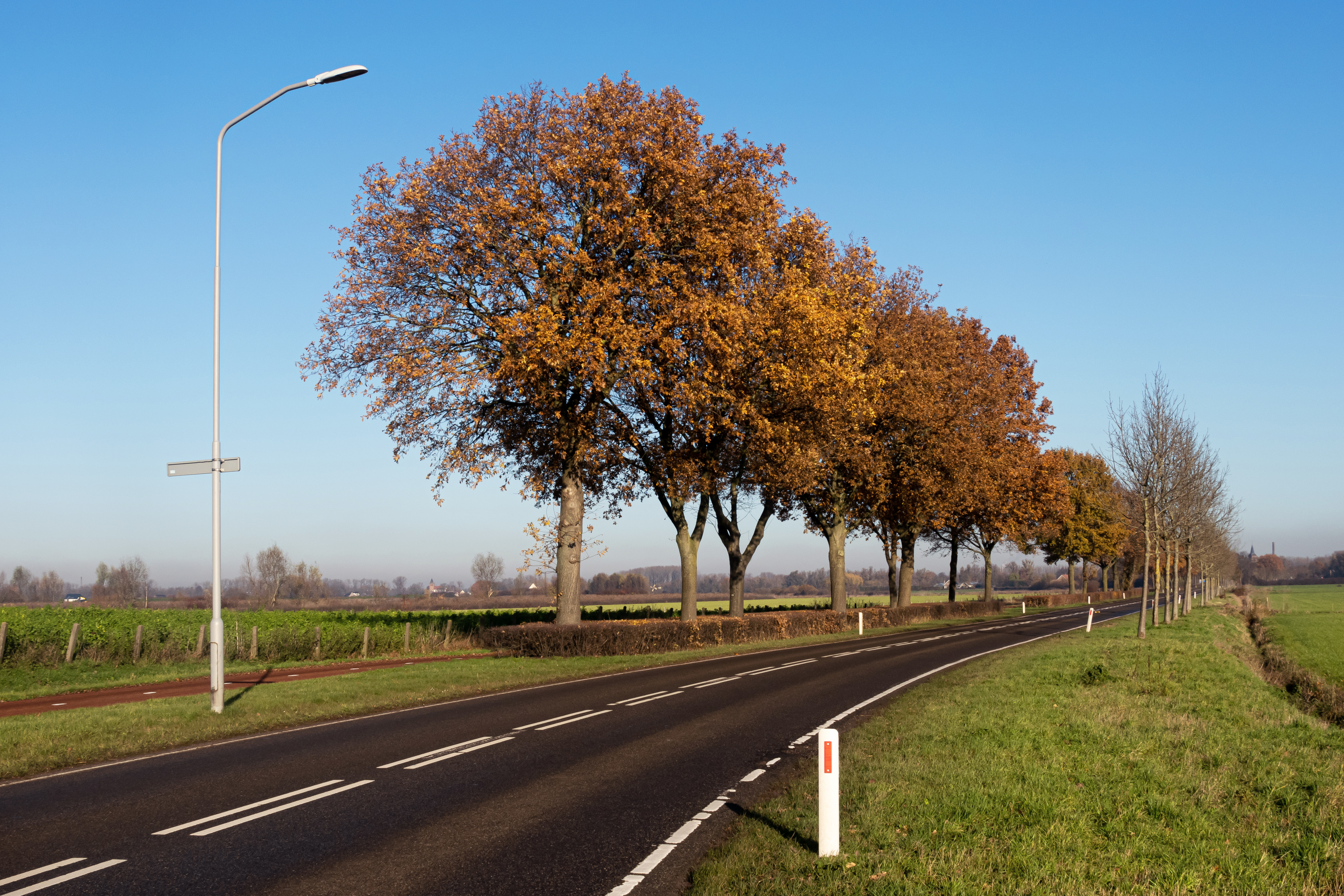

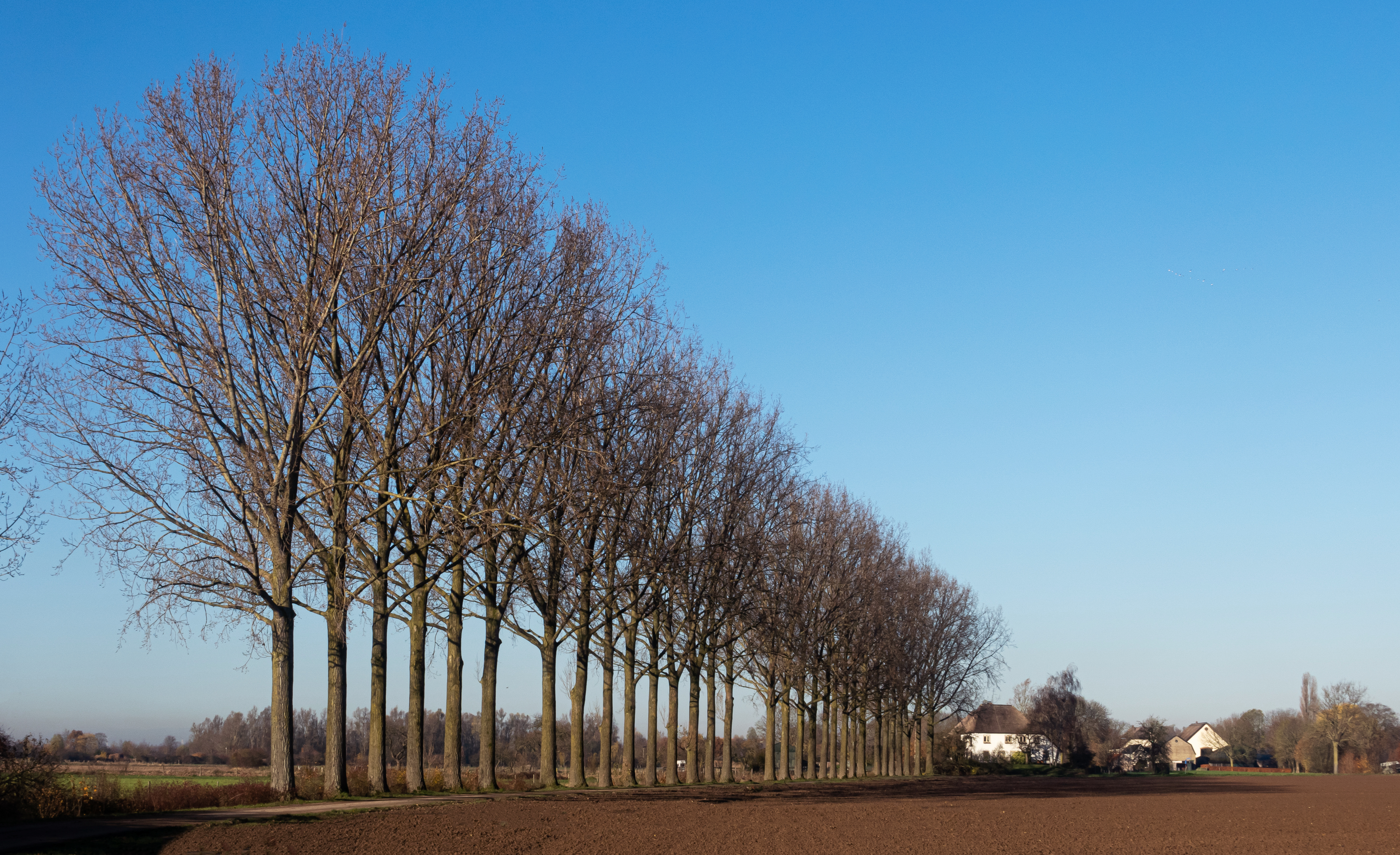
