= Kekerdom =

- Village
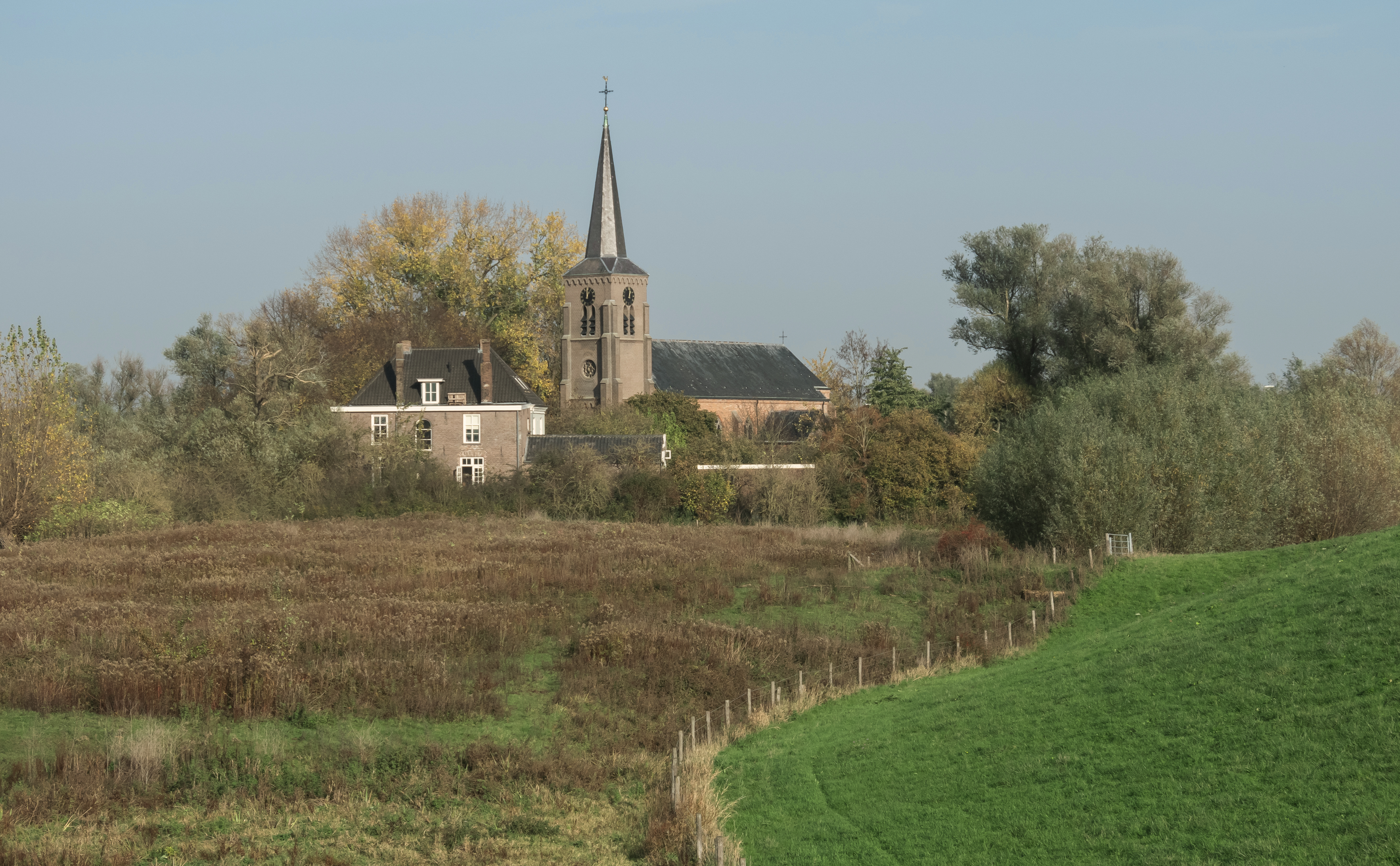
- Church of Kekerdom

- Location in the province of Gelderland Kekerdom (Netherlands)
- Coordinates: 51°52′N 6°00′E
- Country: Netherlands
- Province: Gelderland
- Municipality: Berg en Dal

Area
  - Total: 5.35 km^{2} (2.07 sq mi)
- Elevation: 12 m (39 ft)

Population (2021)
  - Total: 485
  - Density: 90.7/km^{2} (235/sq mi)
- Time zone: UTC+1 (CET)
  - Summer (DST): UTC+2 (CEST)
- Postal code: 6579
- Dialing code: 024

Kekerdom (Dutch pronunciation: [ˈkeːkərdɔm]) is a village in the municipality of Berg en Dal in the province of Gelderland, the Netherlands. Kekerdom has 550 inhabitants (2008).

It was first mentioned between 814 and 815 as Cacradesheim, and means "settlement of Cacrad (person)". In 1840, it was home to 351 people. World War II was reasonably quiet in Kekerdom until Operation Market Garden in September 1944. The village was in the line of fire. The Germans tried to flood the polder to delay the allied advance, and ordered the villagers to leave on 20 October. They arrived in Marum, Groningen where they were given shelter. The gristmill De Duffelt was constructed in 1870 and rebuilt in 1938.

== Gallery ==
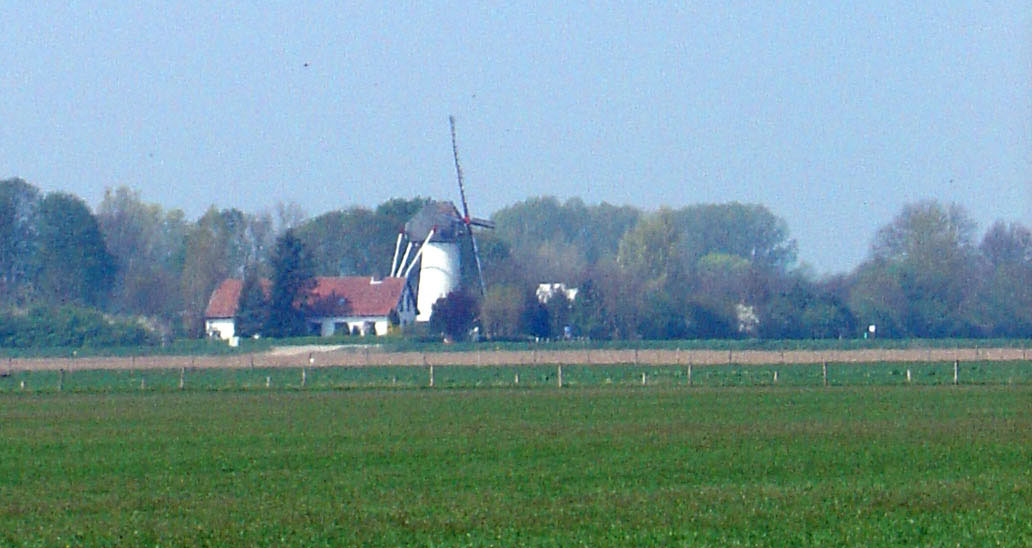
Mill De Duffelt

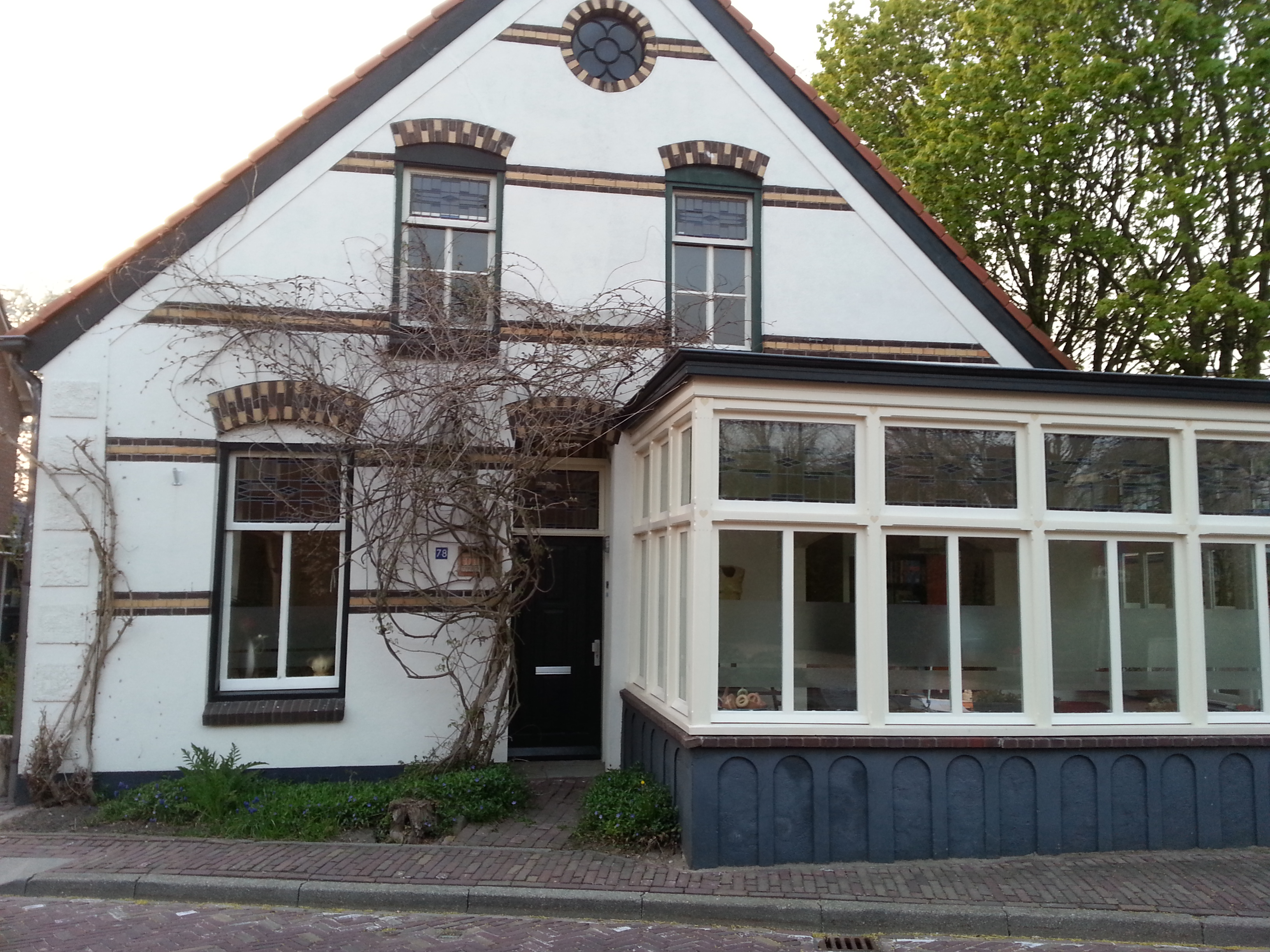
House in Kekerdom

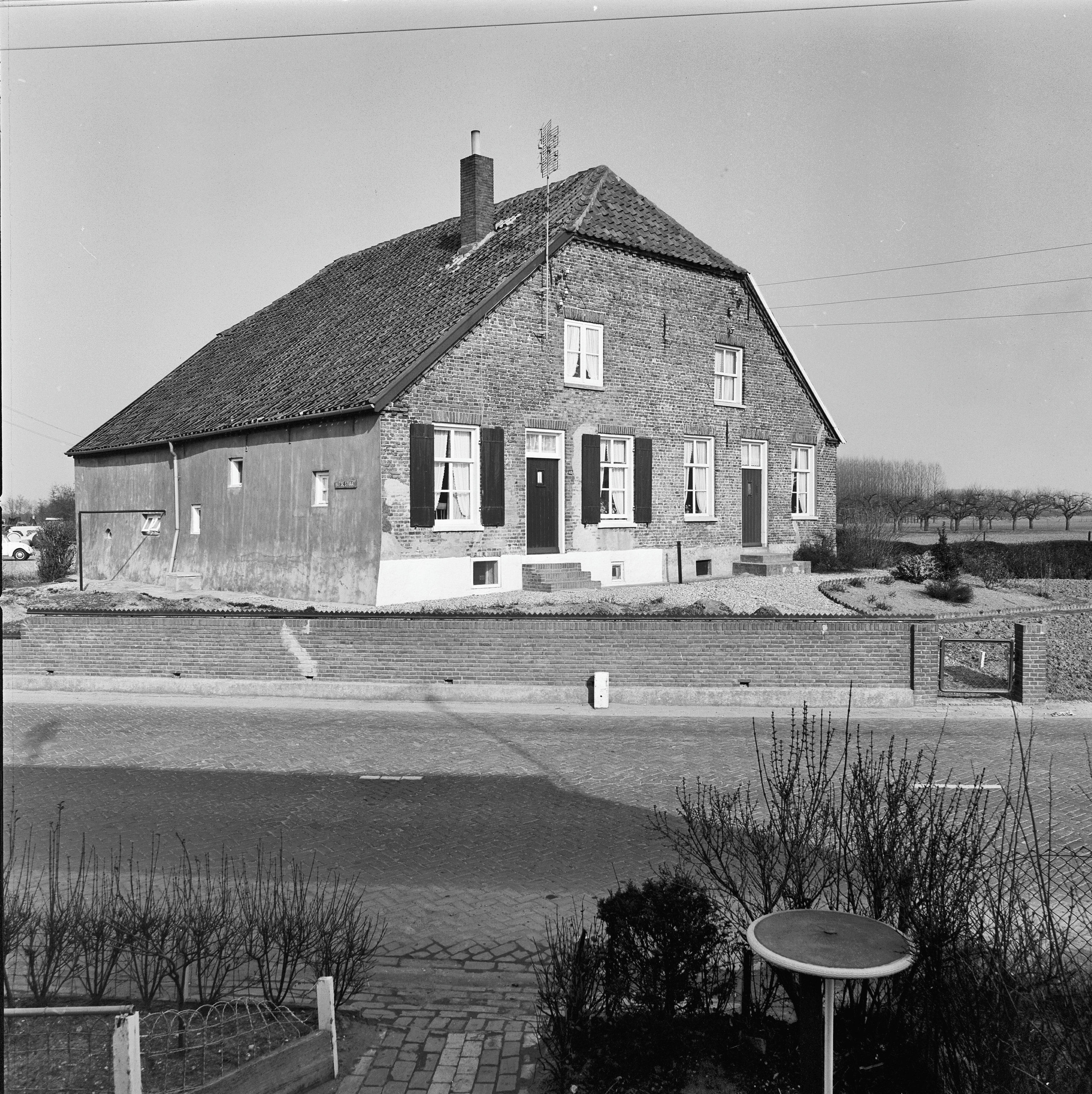
Farm in Kekerdom
