= De Horst =

- Village
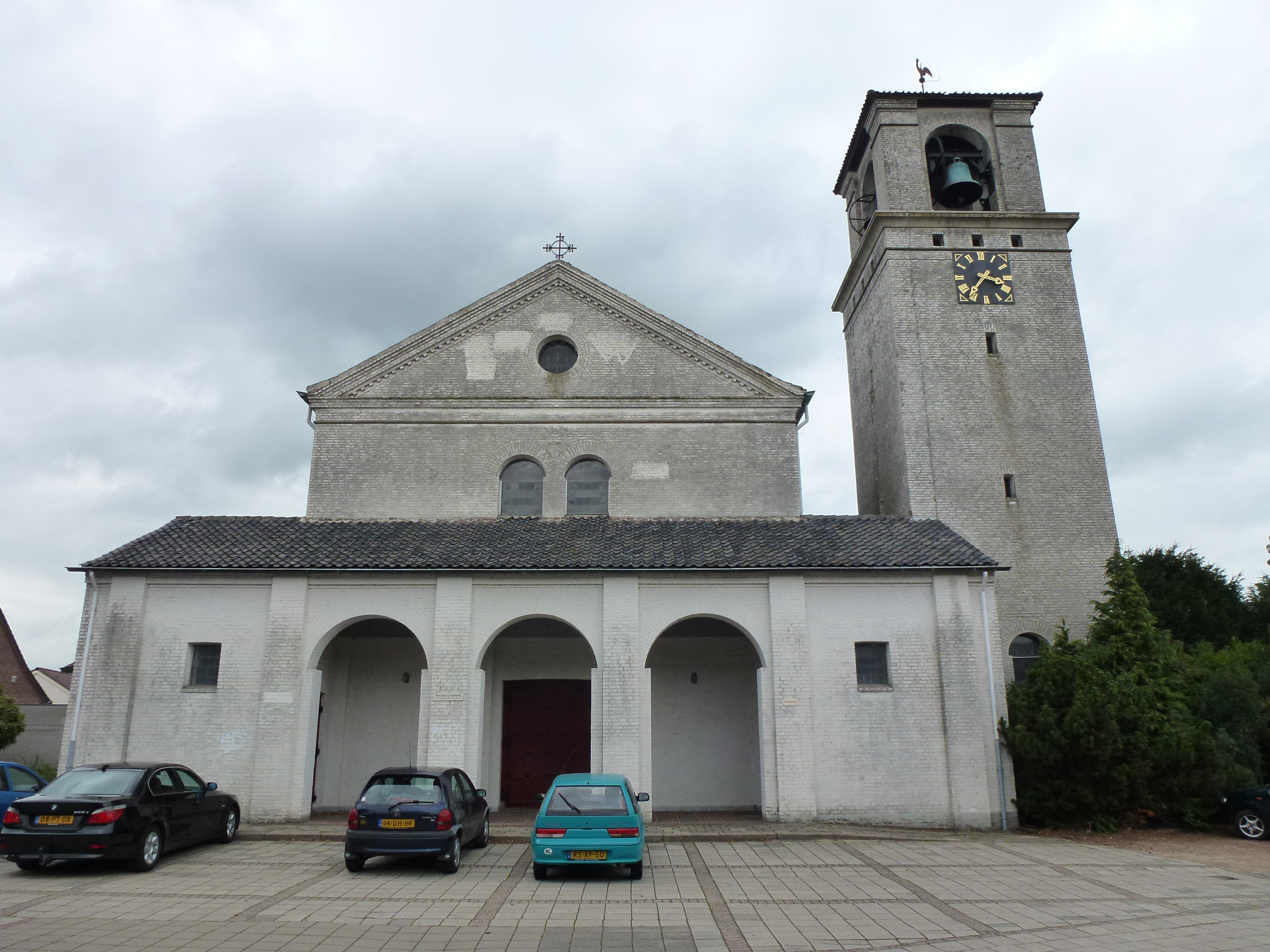
- Divine Heart of Jesus Christ Church

- Location in the province of Gelderland De Horst (Netherlands)
- Coordinates: 51.77409°N 5.96875°E
- Country: Netherlands
- Province: Gelderland
- Municipality: Berg en Dal

Area
  - Total: 6.75 km^{2} (2.61 sq mi)
- Elevation: 37 m (121 ft)

Population (2021)
  - Total: 1,275
  - Density: 189/km^{2} (489/sq mi)
- Time zone: UTC+1 (CET)
  - Summer (DST): UTC+2 (CEST)
- Postal code: 6562
- Dialing code: 024

De Horst (Dutch pronunciation: [də ˈɦɔrst]) is a village in the Dutch province of Gelderland. It is located in the municipality of Berg en Dal, about 2 km east of Groesbeek.

The village started to developed after the Divine Heart of Jesus Christ Church was built in 1928. On 20 September 1944, the village was in the line of fire during Operation Market Garden, and almost all buildings including the church were destroyed. De Horst and Groesbeek have been expanding into a single urban area. In the late 2010s, the municipality changed the place name sign to "Groesbeek De Horst". Nevertheless, it is still a separate village and not annexed.

== Gallery ==
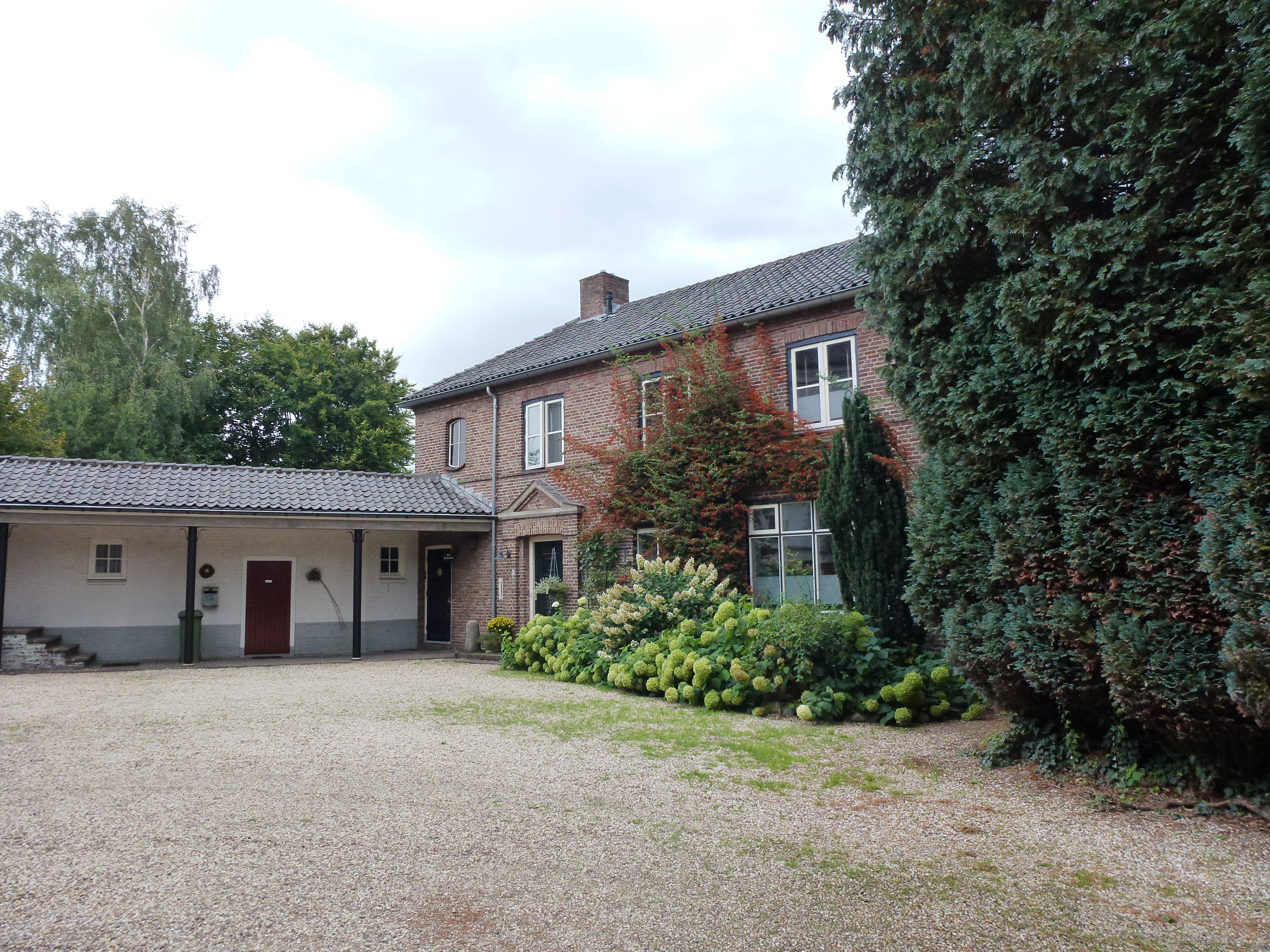
Former clergy house

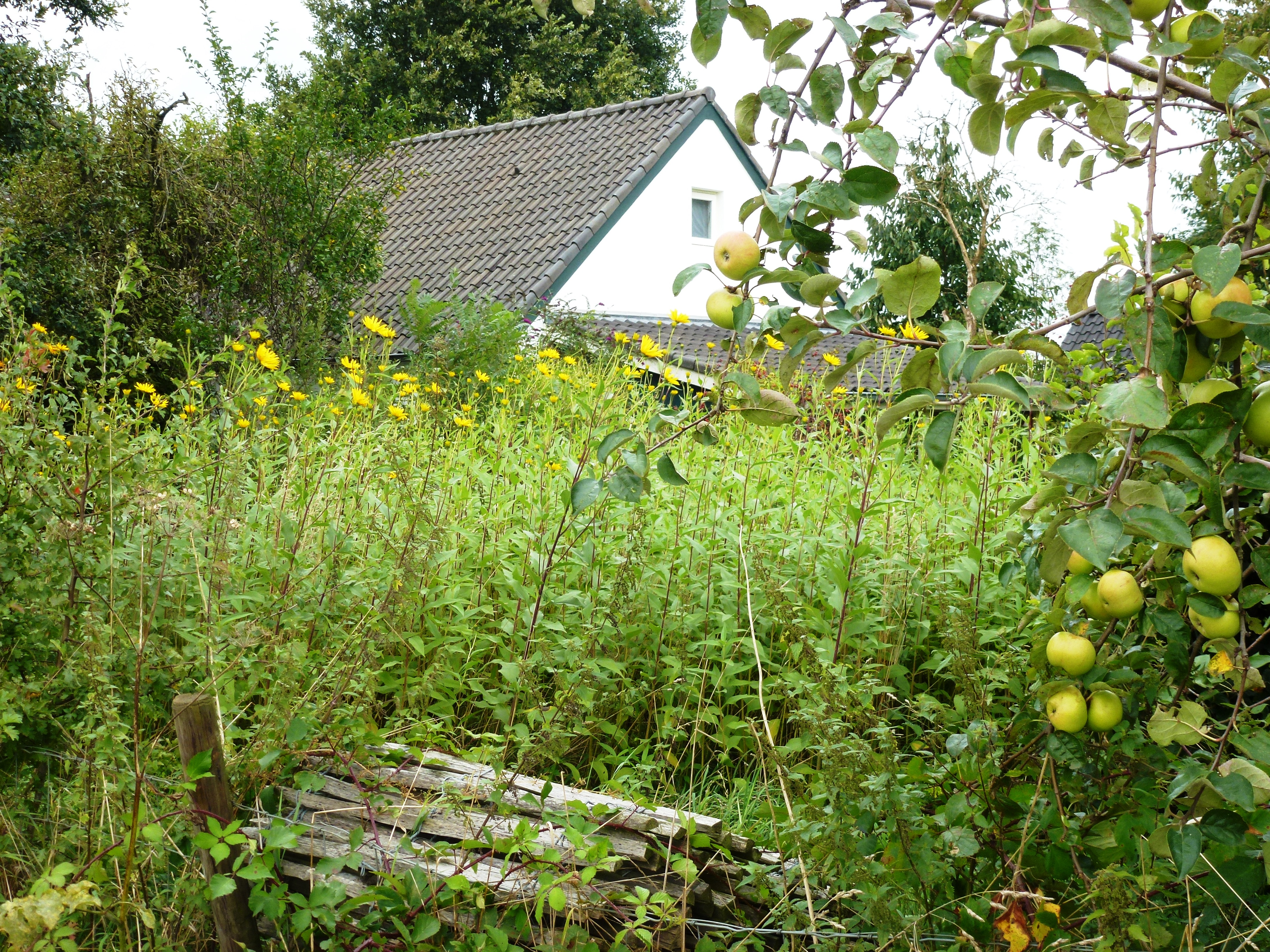
House between grass and apple trees
