= Heikant, Berg en Dal =

Coordinates: 51°47′15″N 5°58′10″E

Heikant is a former hamlet in the municipality of Berg en Dal, in the Dutch province of Gelderland. It was located about 3 km northeast of Groesbeek, on the German border.

According to the 19th-century historian A.J. van der Aa, Heikant (or "De Heikant") consisted of 44 houses and had a population of 140 in the middle of the 19th century.
