= Constantijn Kortmann =

Dutch professor of constitutional law (1944–2016)

Constantinus Albertus Josephus Maria "Constantijn" Kortmann (14 March 1944 – 24 January 2016) was a Dutch professor of constitutional law.

Kortmann was born in Groesbeek. In 1967, he obtained his doctoral’s degree in Dutch Law at the Catholic University of Nijmegen. In 1964, he studied the French language for half a year at the Institut Catholique in Paris, France. After his degree he pursued his study of the French language, as well as French public law, for another year at the University of Poitiers. In 1976, he obtained his doctor's degree (master) at the Catholic University of Nijmegen. From 1976 to 1981, Kortmann was a professor of Dutch and comparative constitutional law at the University of Amsterdam, since 1981 he has been a professor of constitutional law and general political science. Furthermore, he has been a dean of the Faculty of Law, twice in Nijmegen and once in Amsterdam. He became member of the Royal Netherlands Academy of Arts and Sciences (KNAW) in 2000. In 2004 the KNAW entitled him with an academy professorship.

The handbook Constitutioneel Recht (Constitutional Law, for which Kortmann received the Thorkbecke Prize in 1996), Het staatsrecht van de landen van de Europese Unie (Constitutional law of the Member States of the European Union), and Het bestuursrecht van de landen der Europese Gemeenschappen (Public Law of the Member States of the European Communities) are amongst his most important publications. The latter two books were edited by Kortmann in cooperation with professor Lucas Prakke.

In 2005, the second chamber of the Dutch parliament appointed him to be the chairman of the referendum committee on the rejected Treaty establishing a Constitution for Europe. This committee summarised the Treaty text and divided allowances between the advocates and adversaries of the Treaty.

Kortmann’s brother, Sebastiaan Kortmann, is a professor of Dutch civil law, and was Rector Magnificus of the Radboud University Nijmegen from 10 May 2007 until 17 October 2014.

Kortmann was asked regularly to give advice and explanation in matters of public law in Dutch media.

Constantijn Kortmann died in Heilig Landstichting in 2016.

== Decorations ==
- Order of the Netherlands Lion
  - Knight (2009)
