= Bijlands Kanaal =

Canal in Gelderland, the Netherlands

Coordinates: 51°51′30″N 6°04′37″E

The Bijlands Kanaal (Bijland Canal) is a canal in the Dutch province of Gelderland, near the Dutch-German border. It is currently by far the most important river-stretch of the Rhine when that major river enters the Netherlands.

It was dug between 1773 and 1776 to cut off a large bend in river Waal to improve water regulation. This bend, and comparable waters, are currently only minor streams. They are known as the minor Oude Waal and De Bijland, and the larger Oude Rijn. The, more or less, defunct flows now only serve one purpose: to function as a buffer zone between the free flowing Waal and Nederrijn on one side and the abandoned stream-beds on the other side. The defunct streams are shallow waters for most of the time and serve as an important spawning ground for all kinds of fish (since they remained connected to the main river through small creeks).

However, in times of extreme high water-levels the 'dead' waters spring to life again, as the result of artificial overflow-devices. From time to time, the Oude Waal and De Bijland can temporarily taste the freedom of a free-flowing river. The area surrounding the 'dead' rivers is known for its historical significance and is a relic of a type of historical dyke landscape that is becoming more and more rare in the Netherlands.

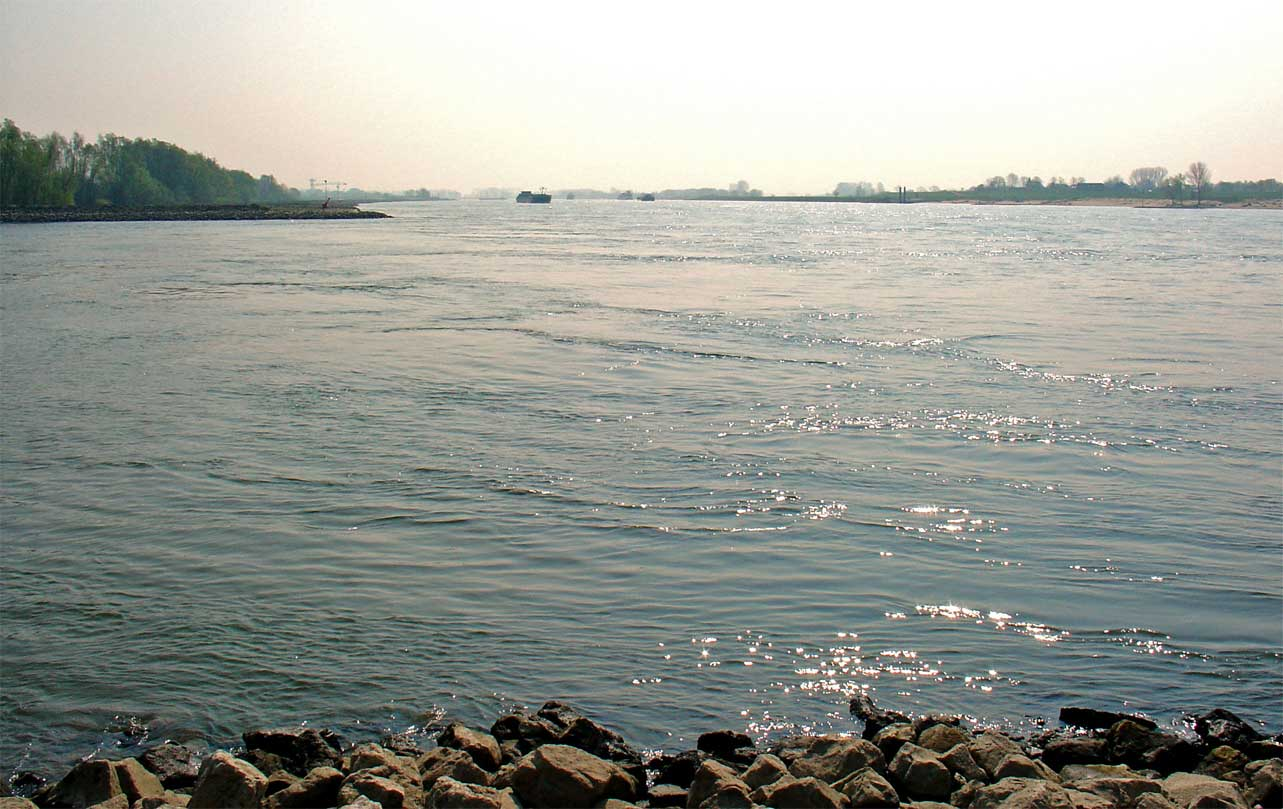
Near Millingen

The Bijlands Kanaal is part of the extensive reconstruction works that Gelderland, then a semi-independent state within the federation of the Dutch Republic, undertook to better regulate water flow around the Rhine-Waal fork. It is named after Castle De Bijland, which had been destroyed by the river Waal circa 1750. In addition to the Bijlands Kanaal, the Pannerdens Kanaal is part also part of the same river regulation system. Both canals cut off shallow and slow-moving bends in the river Rhine, now known as the Oude Waal and De Bijland. Although both waters are called "Kanaal" (English: canal) they are now an indistinguishable part of the river and both lost all characteristics of an artificial structure. The area surrounding both the main rivers Waal and Rhine, and the mostly defunct abandoned streams, are all part of the extensive nature restoration project known as the Gelderse Poort.

Nowadays, the canal is of enormous importance to Rhine navigation, being part of the main Rhine waterway and the first section of the Waal-Rhine fork.
