= Ooij, Berg en Dal =

Ooij
- Village
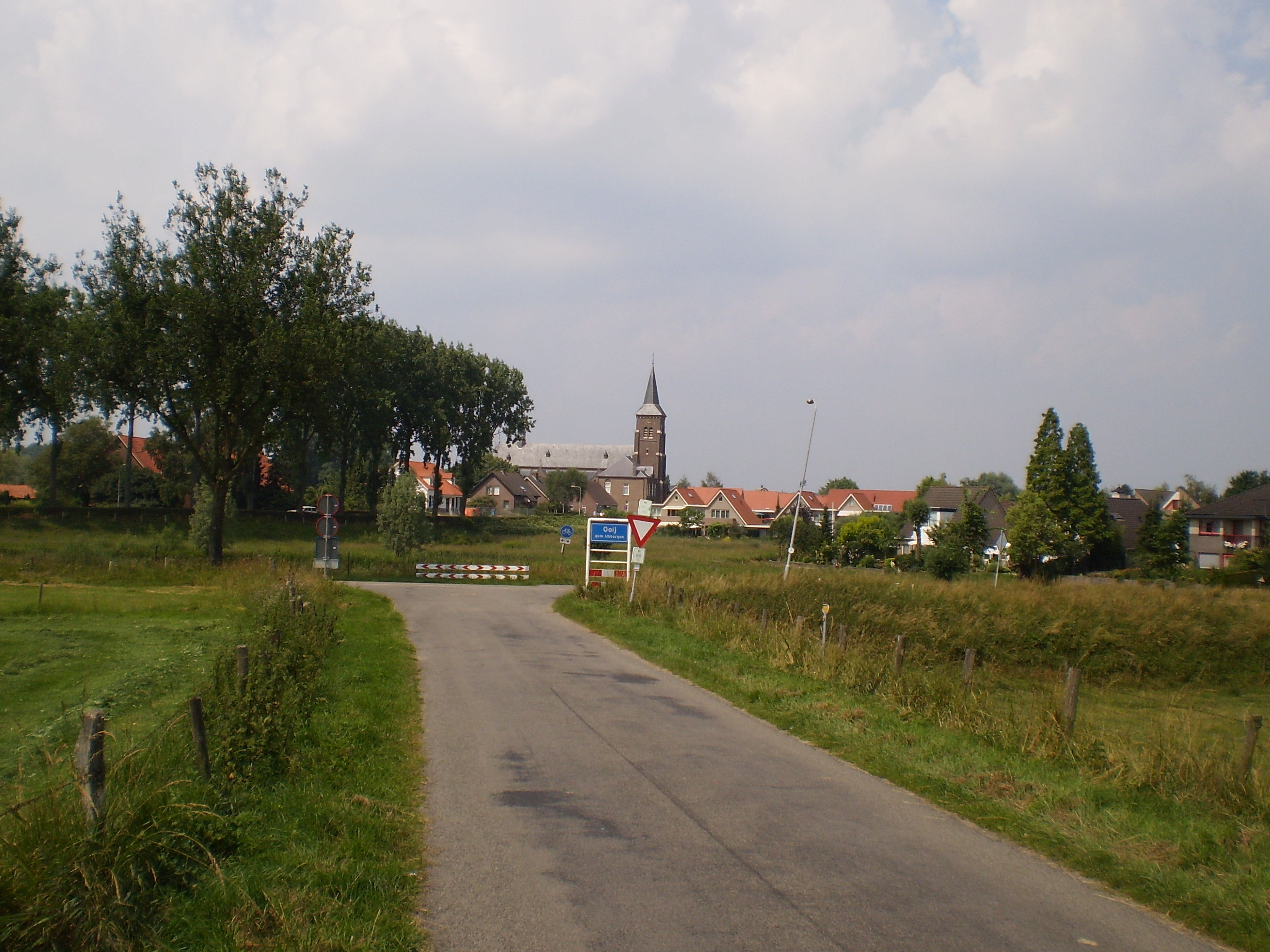
- View of Ooij

- Location in the province of Gelderland Ooij (Netherlands)
- Coordinates: 51.855°N 5.940°E
- Country: Netherlands
- Province: Gelderland
- Municipality: Berg en Dal

Area
  - Total: 12.34 km^{2} (4.76 sq mi)
- Elevation: 11 m (36 ft)

Population (2021)
  - Total: 2,520
  - Density: 204/km^{2} (529/sq mi)
- Time zone: UTC+1 (CET)
  - Summer (DST): UTC+2 (CEST)
- Postal code: 6576
- Dialing code: 024

Ooij (Dutch pronunciation: [oːi̯]) is a village in the eastern Netherlands. It is located in the municipality of Berg en Dal, Gelderland.

== History ==
It was first mentioned in 1081 as de Oge, and means "land near water". Ooij developed in the early Middle Ages on higher grounds near the Waal River. The tower of the Dutch Reformed Church dates from the late 15th century. The church was redesigned between 1856 and 1858. Up to 1818, it was part of the Kingdom of Prussia. In 1840, it was home to 463 people.

Castle Ooij was first mentioned in 1184. In 1582, it was set on fire by Nijmegen. It was rebuilt, and destroyed by the French in 1798. The northern side of the Government House remained standing, and is dated 1514. The stables were rebuilt in 1950 as a residential house, and in 1978, the building was restored.

== Gallery ==
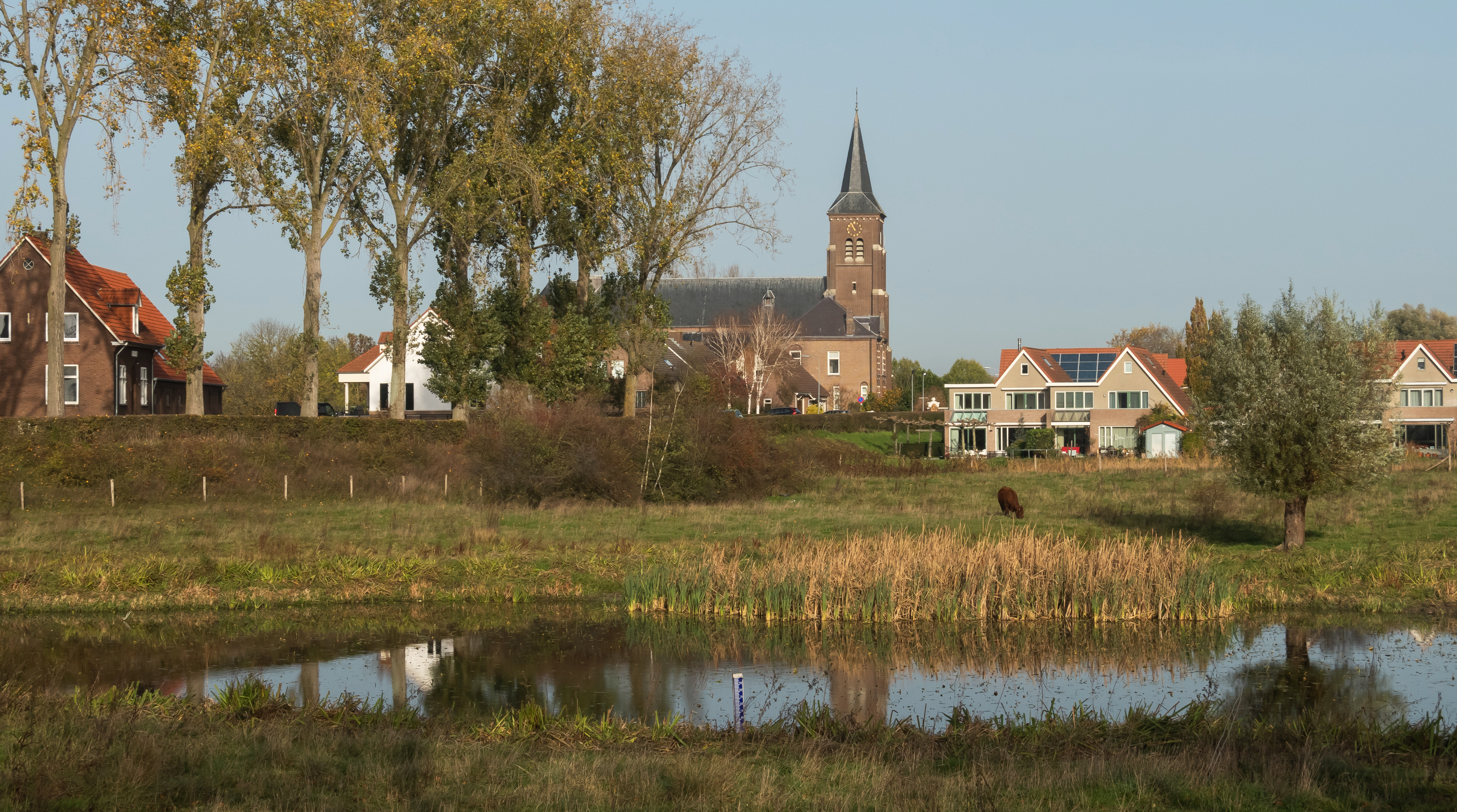
Sint-Hubertuskerk

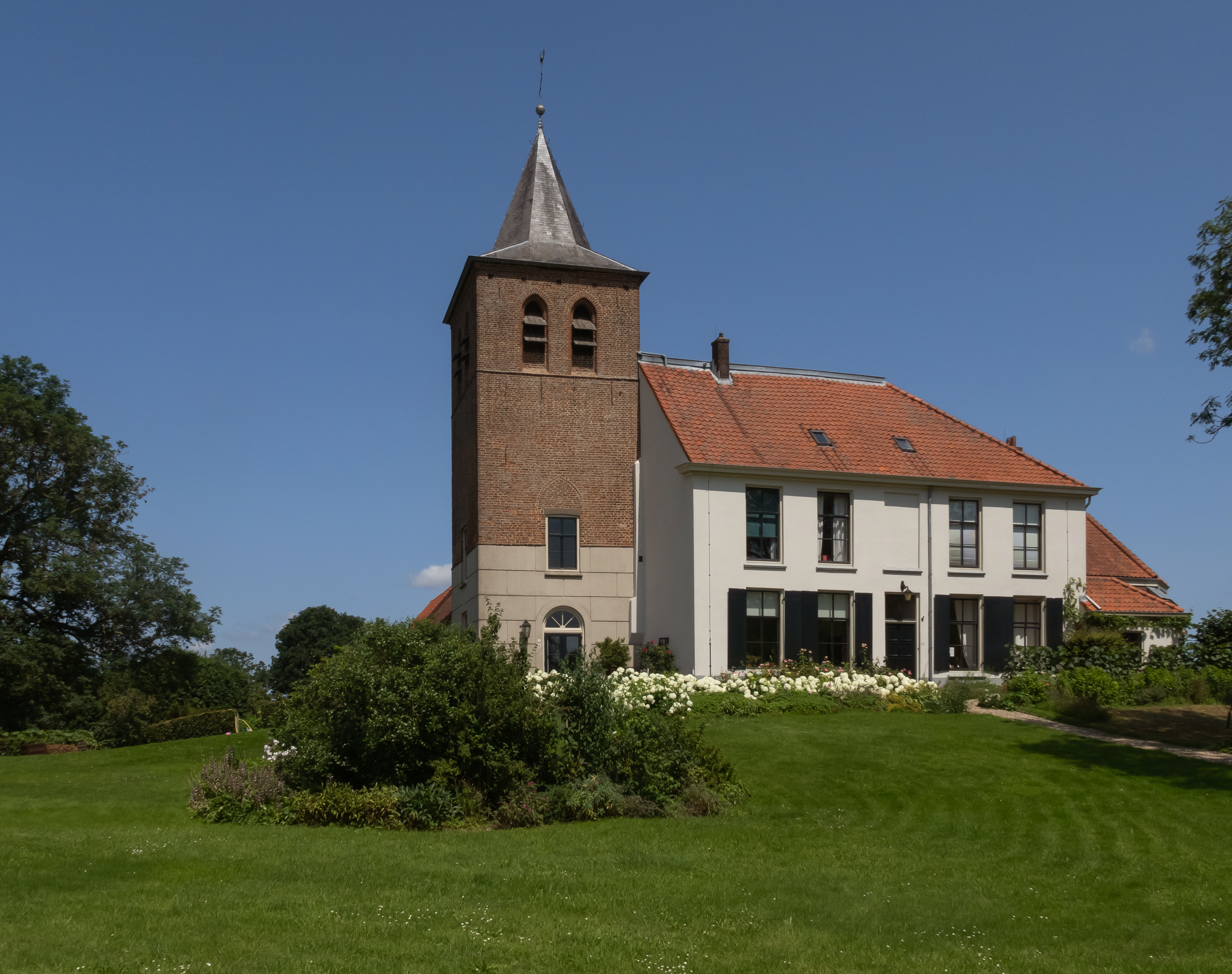
Reformed church

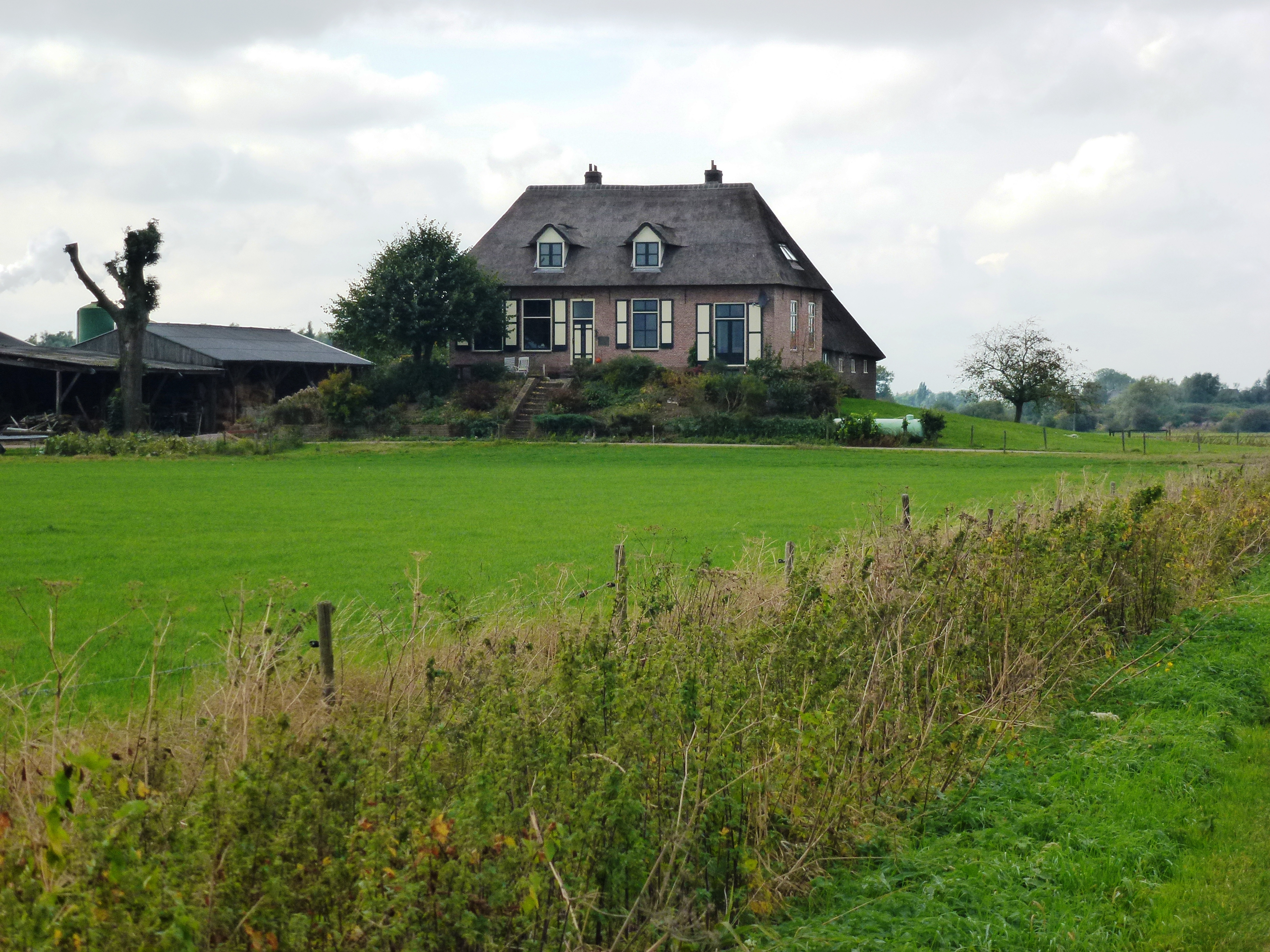
Farm De Plak

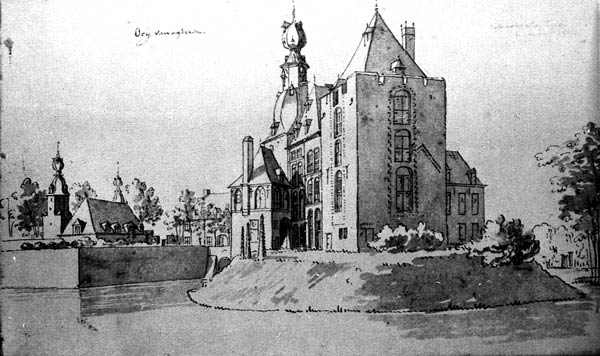
Castle Ooij
