= Duivelsberg =

Dutch hill and nature reserve

- Wylerberg
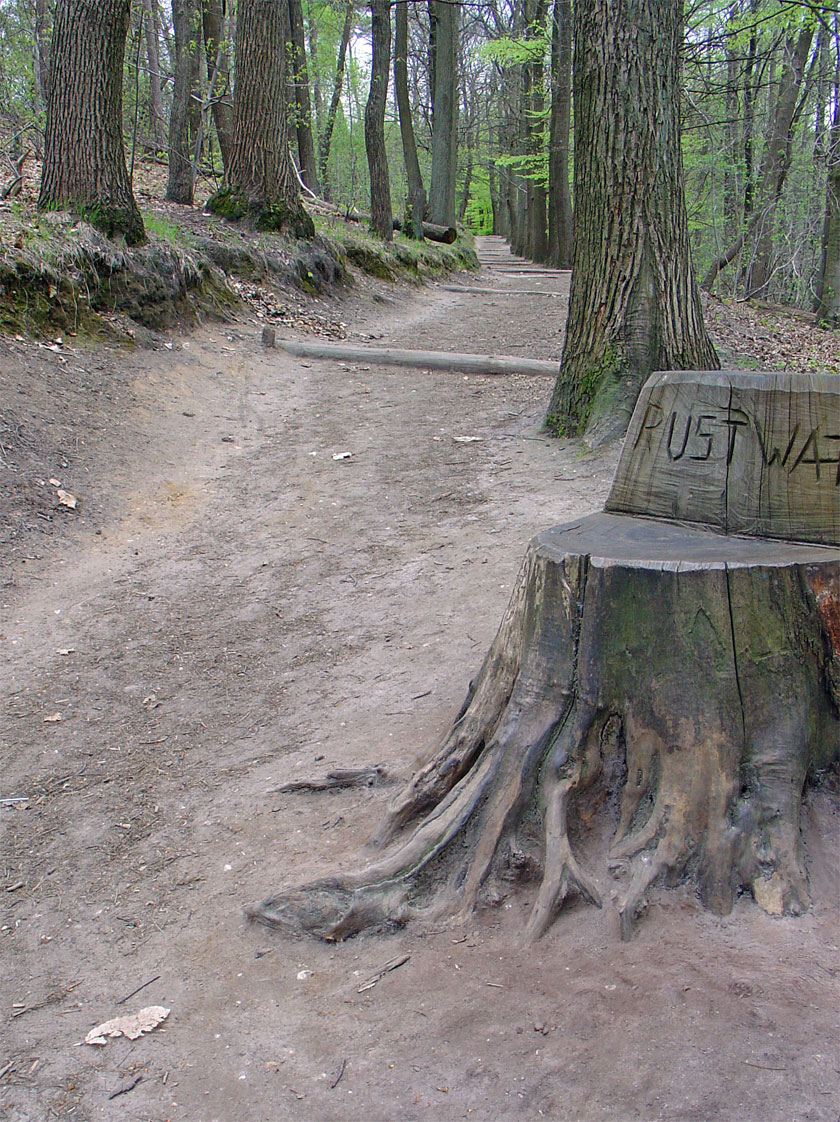

Highest point
- Elevation: 75.9 m (249 ft)
- Coordinates: 51°49′14″N 5°56′37″E

Geography
- Location within Gelderland
- Location: Gelderland, Netherlands

Duivelsberg (German: Wylerberg, later Teufelsberg; literally: devil's hill) is a hill and nature reserve in the municipality of Berg en Dal in the Dutch province of Gelderland, near the border with Germany (North Rhine-Westphalia). It is politically significant, however, because Duivelsberg is the only part of the territory annexed from Germany after World War II that the Netherlands has retained to the present day.

== Location ==
The hill is located on a moraine east of Nijmegen, between Berg en Dal, Beek and the Dutch-German border. The nature reserve covers about 125 hectares (310 acres) and is predominantly covered with deciduous trees, especially chestnut. It is managed by the Staatsbosbeheer, the Dutch Forestry Commission.

== History ==
Over the centuries the hill has been militarily significant, this historical background in more recent times having given rise to issues of sovereignty between Germany and The Netherlands.

=== Military history from Middle Ages to Second World War ===
In the Middle Ages Mergelp Castle stood on the hill. In September 1944 airborne troops of the U.S. 508th Parachute Infantry Regiment fought to capture the Duivelsberg, "Hill 75.9", during Operation Market Garden.

=== Annexation issues ===
Until 1949, the hill was part of the nearby German village of Wyler in the municipality of Kranenburg. Duivelsberg's German name, Wylerberg, is derived from the name of this village. With the notable support of Dutch politician Frits Bakker Schut, Duivelsberg was one of the many small areas the Netherlands annexed from Germany on 23 April 1949. Unlike the other areas, Duivelsberg was not returned to the German authorities on 1 August 1963 and remained Dutch territory. During the negotiations with Germany, the politician Marinus van der Goes van Naters, who also lived in nearby Nijmegen, where he was born, successfully urged for the nature reserve to be kept Dutch.

=== Ownership and conservation ===
The Duivelsberg was inherited in 1906 by Marie Schuster-Hiby, who, between 1921 and 1924, built an expressionist villa designed by the German architect Otto Bartning. In 1965, the Schuster-Hiby family sold the villa to the Dutch state. Since 1985, the Huis Wylerberg has been a nationally-protected building in which conservation organisations are located.

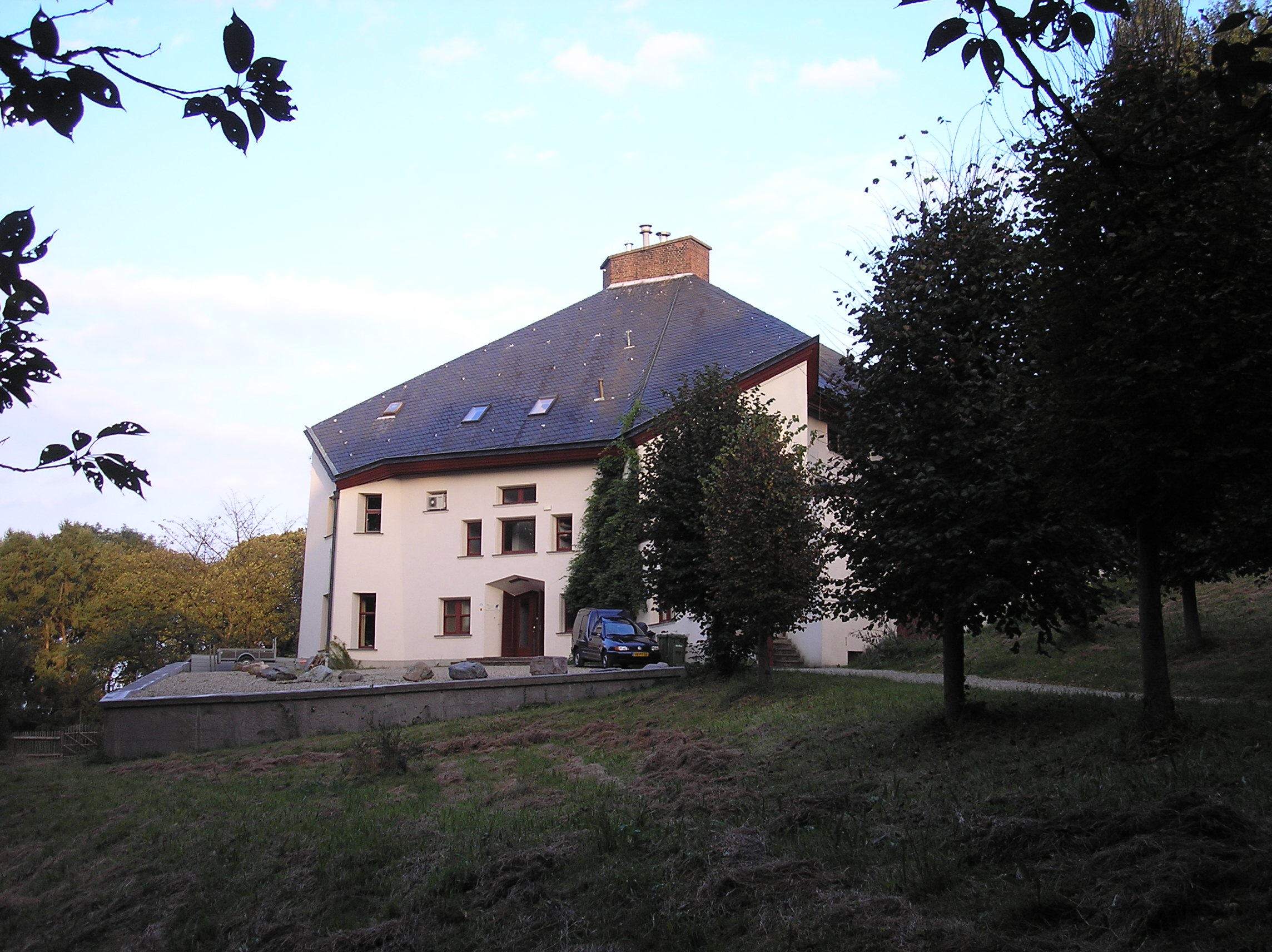
Huis Wylerberg

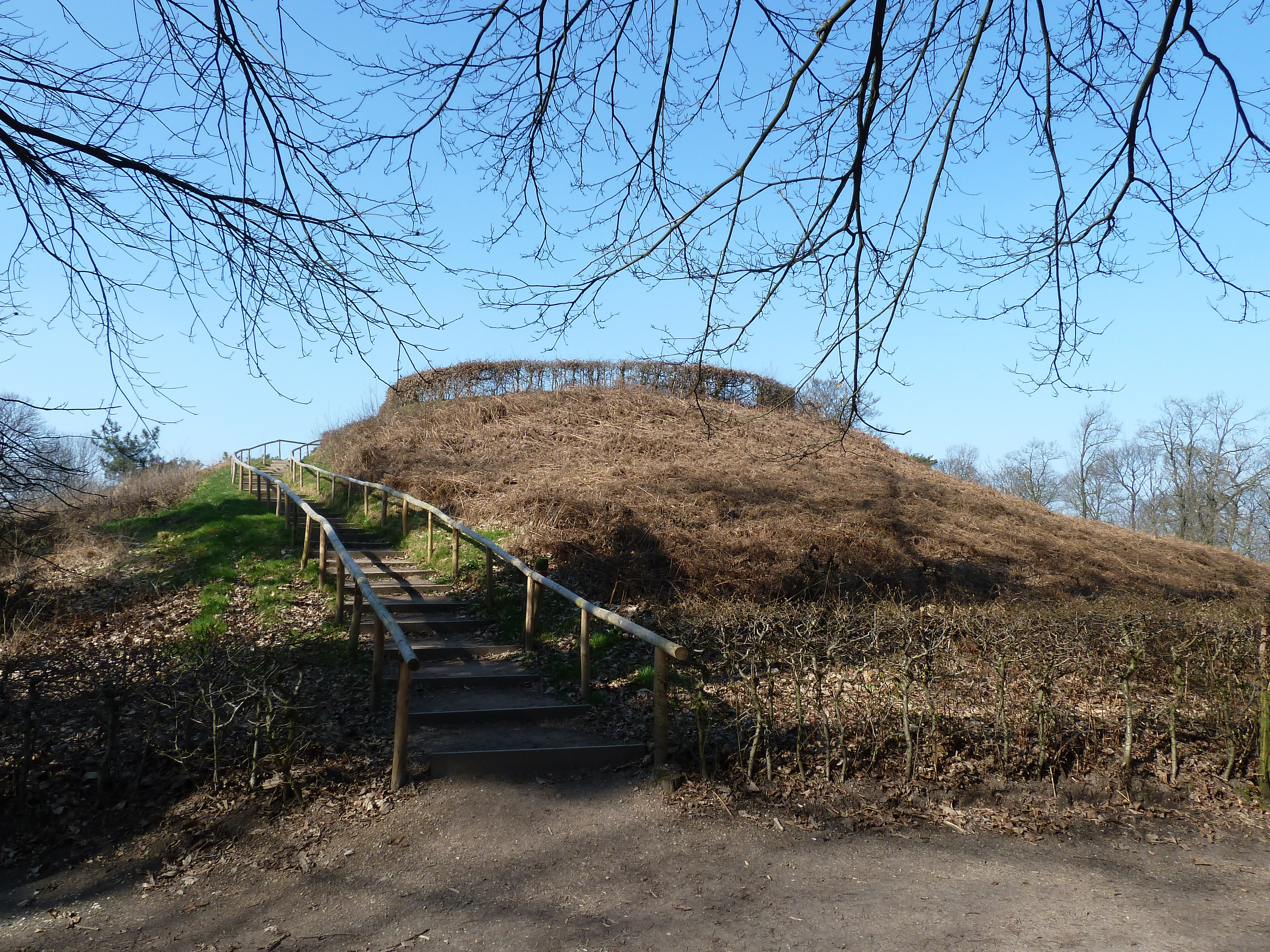
Castle Hill

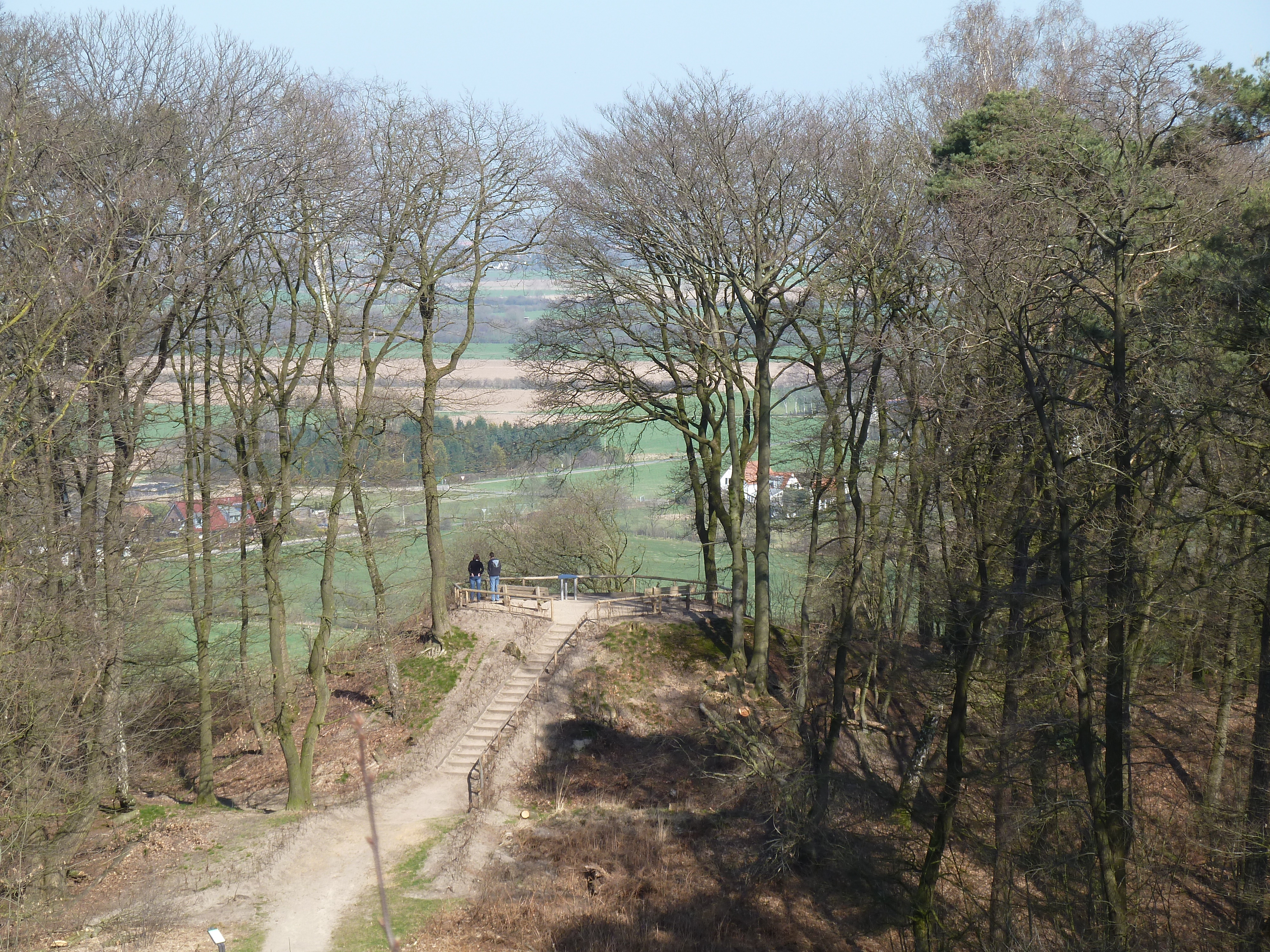
View from the hilltop with Germany in background

== See also ==
- Wyler, North Rhine-Westphalia
- Marinus van der Goes van Naters#German border issues after WW2
