= Zelem =

Zelem may refer to: Zeelhem

- Zelem, Limburg, part of Halen, Limburg, Belgium
  - Zelem Charterhouse, Carthusian monastery in Zelem
- Zelem Castle, a moated castle in Kranenburg, North Rhine-Westphalia, Germany

== People with the surname ==
- Katie Zelem (born 1996), English footballer
- Natasha Sayce-Zelem (born 1983), English computer scientist
- Peter Zelem (born 1962), English footballer
