= Geoffrey Anson =

English cricketer and civil servant

Personal information
- Full name: Geoffrey Frank Anson
- Born: 8 October 1922; Sevenoaks, Kent, England
- Died: 4 December 1977 (aged 55); Hastings, Sussex, England
- Batting: Right-handed
- Role: Batsman

Domestic team information
- Years: Team
- 1947: Cambridge University
- 1947: Kent
- FC debut: 10 May 1947 Cambridge University v Essex
- Last FC: 23 August 1947 Kent v Somerset

Career statistics
Competition	First-class
Matches	10
Runs scored	460
Batting average	25.55
100s/50s	1/2
Top score	106
Catches/stumpings	6/0
- Source: CricInfo, 19 March 2017

Geoffrey Frank Anson (8 October 1922 – 4 December 1977) was an English cricketer and civil servant. A right-handed batsman, he played ten first-class cricket matches during the 1947 English cricket season for Cambridge University and Kent County Cricket Club. He also played cricket for a team of Europeans in Nigeria whilst serving in the British Colonial Service.

== Early life and war service ==
Anson was born at Sevenoaks in Kent in 1922 and educated at Harrow School, where he played cricket and captained the team during his final season in 1941. Wisden considered that he might have been the "best schoolboy batsman of the year" and described him as being a "daring stroke player". He initially went up to the University of Cambridge in 1941 and played cricket for the university team during the summer of 1942, before serving in the armed forces during World War II. He was commissioned in the Coldstream Guards as a 2nd Lieutenant in April 1943 and served in the 4th Battalion, part of the Guards Armoured Division. He was awarded the Military Cross in May 1945 whilst serving as a Lieutenant. Anson was serving as a tank commander during Operation Veritable, an offensive along the Siegfried Line on the Dutch-German border near Nijmegen in February. He had dismounted to organise mine clearance parties to allow the capture of Frasselt by the 9th Cameronians.

== Cricket and later life ==
He went back to Cambridge in 1946 before leaving to join the Colonial Service the following summer. Anson made his first-class cricket debut for the university against Essex in May 1947 and was set to win a Blue before "the claims of the Colonial Service forced him to withdraw from the team and he was unable to play in the University match". Later in the year he played seven County Championship matches for Kent, his last first-class match coming against Somerset in August.

Anson worked in the Colonial Service and played a number of matches for Nigeria Europeans against Gold Coast Europeans between 1949 and 1956. He later played for the Kent Second XI between 1957 and 1959 and worked as an area manager for the Ford Motor Credit Company based in London. He died at Hastings in 1977 aged 55.
