= Netterden =

- Village
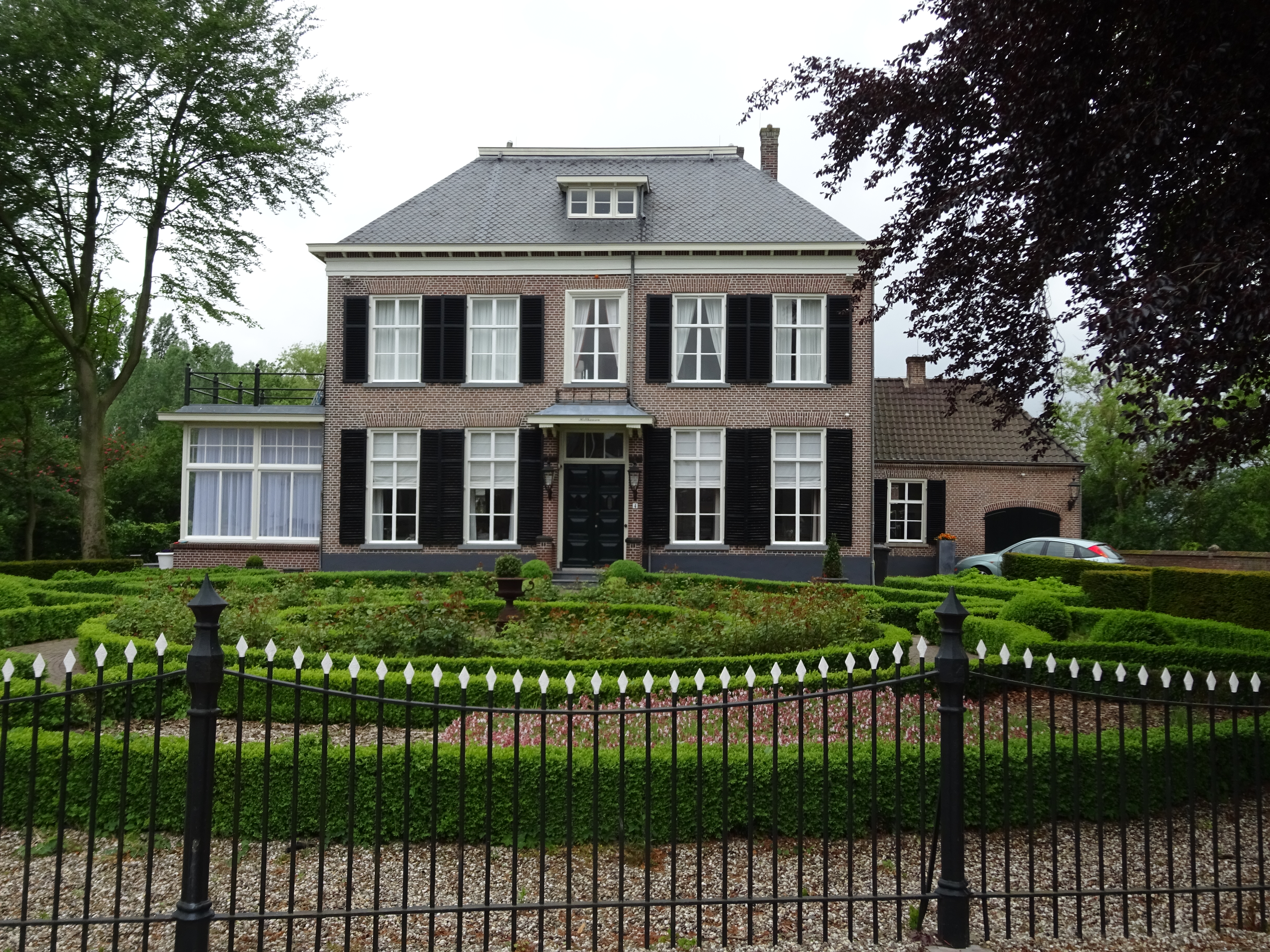
- Walburgisplein 4

- Coat of arms

- Location in the Netherlands Netterden (Netherlands)
- Coordinates: 51°51′16″N 6°18′51″E
- Country: Netherlands
- Province: Gelderland
- Municipality: Oude IJsselstreek

Area
  - Total: 9.45 km^{2} (3.65 sq mi)
- Elevation: 15 m (49 ft)

Population (2021)
  - Total: 575
  - Density: 60.8/km^{2} (158/sq mi)
- Time zone: UTC+1 (CET)
  - Summer (DST): UTC+2 (CEST)
- Postal code: 7077
- Dialing code: 0315
- Website: netterden.nl

Netterden is a village in the Dutch province of Gelderland. It is located in the municipality of Oude IJsselstreek, about 5 km northeast of Emmerich am Rhein in Germany.

Netterden was a separate municipality until 1821, when it was merged with Bergh. The village has a border crossing to Emmerich am Rhein. The Netterdenscher Kanal is the border canal separating both countries.

== History ==
It was first mentioned in 1218 as Netterthen. The etymology is unclear. The village of Nütterden is just across the border. In 1840, it was home to 350 people. In 2011, a little Lady chapel appeared in Netterden. It is unclear who made and placed it there.

== Gallery ==
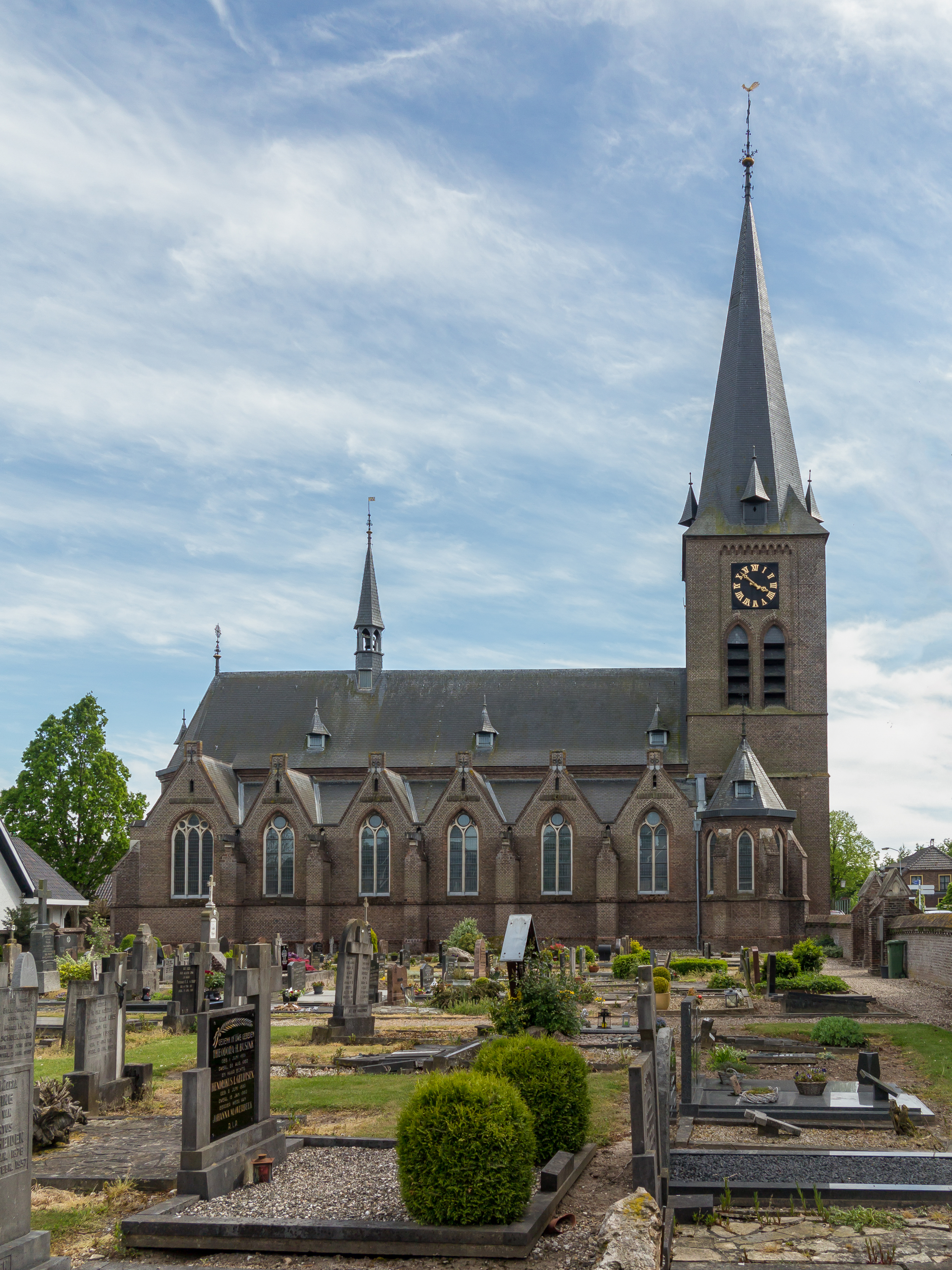
Church: de Sint Walburgiskerk

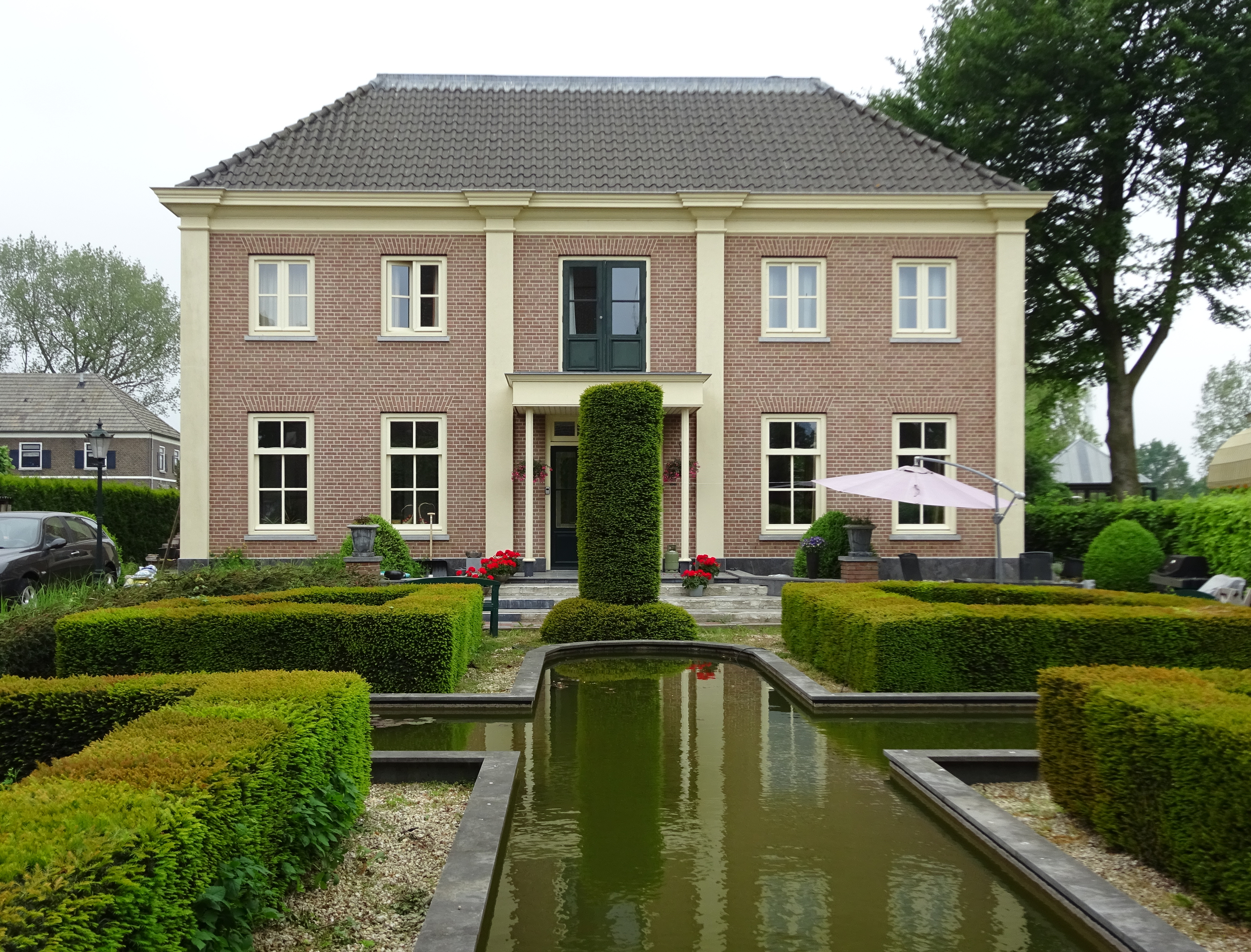
Walburgisplein 3

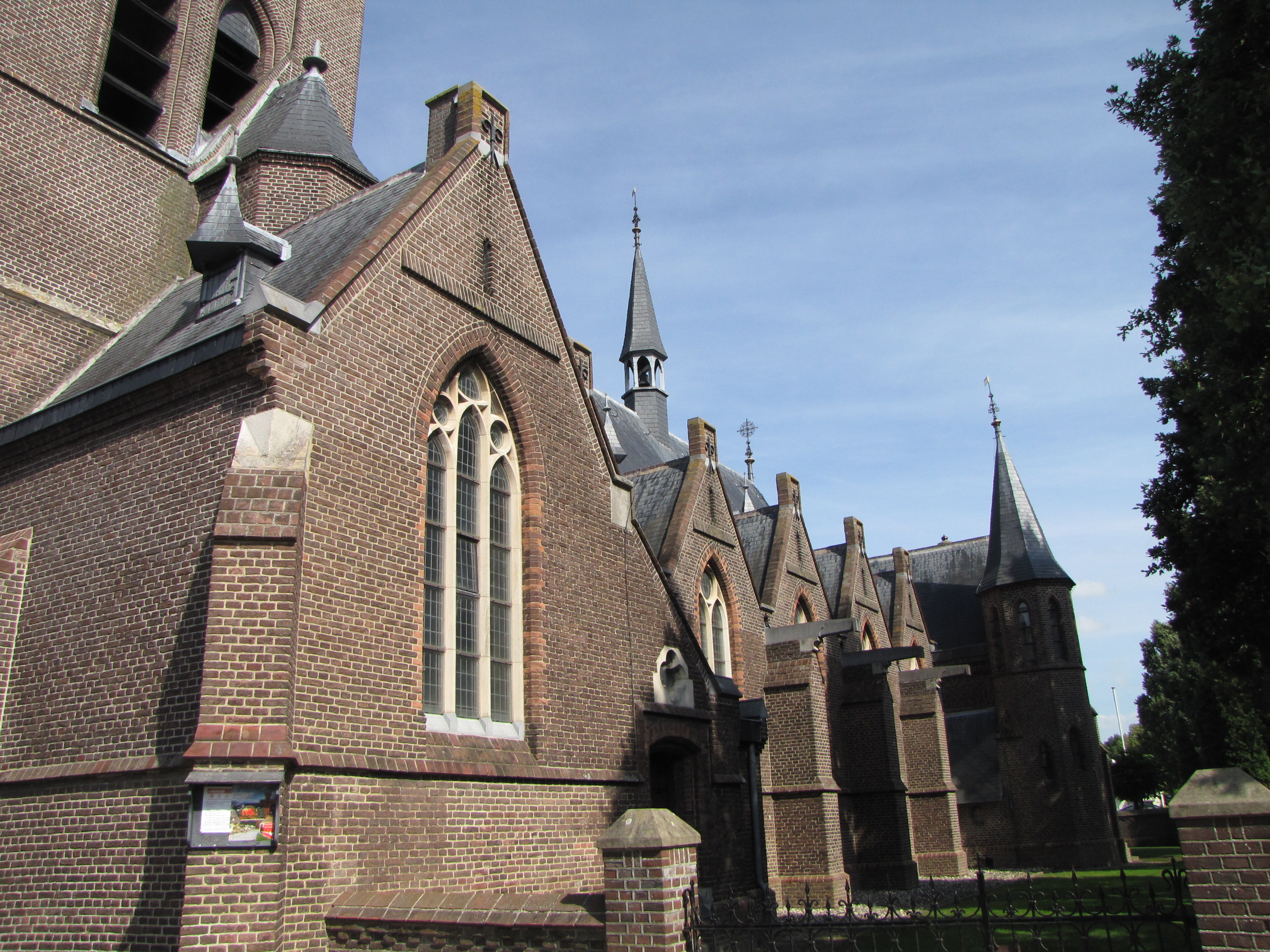
St. Walburgis

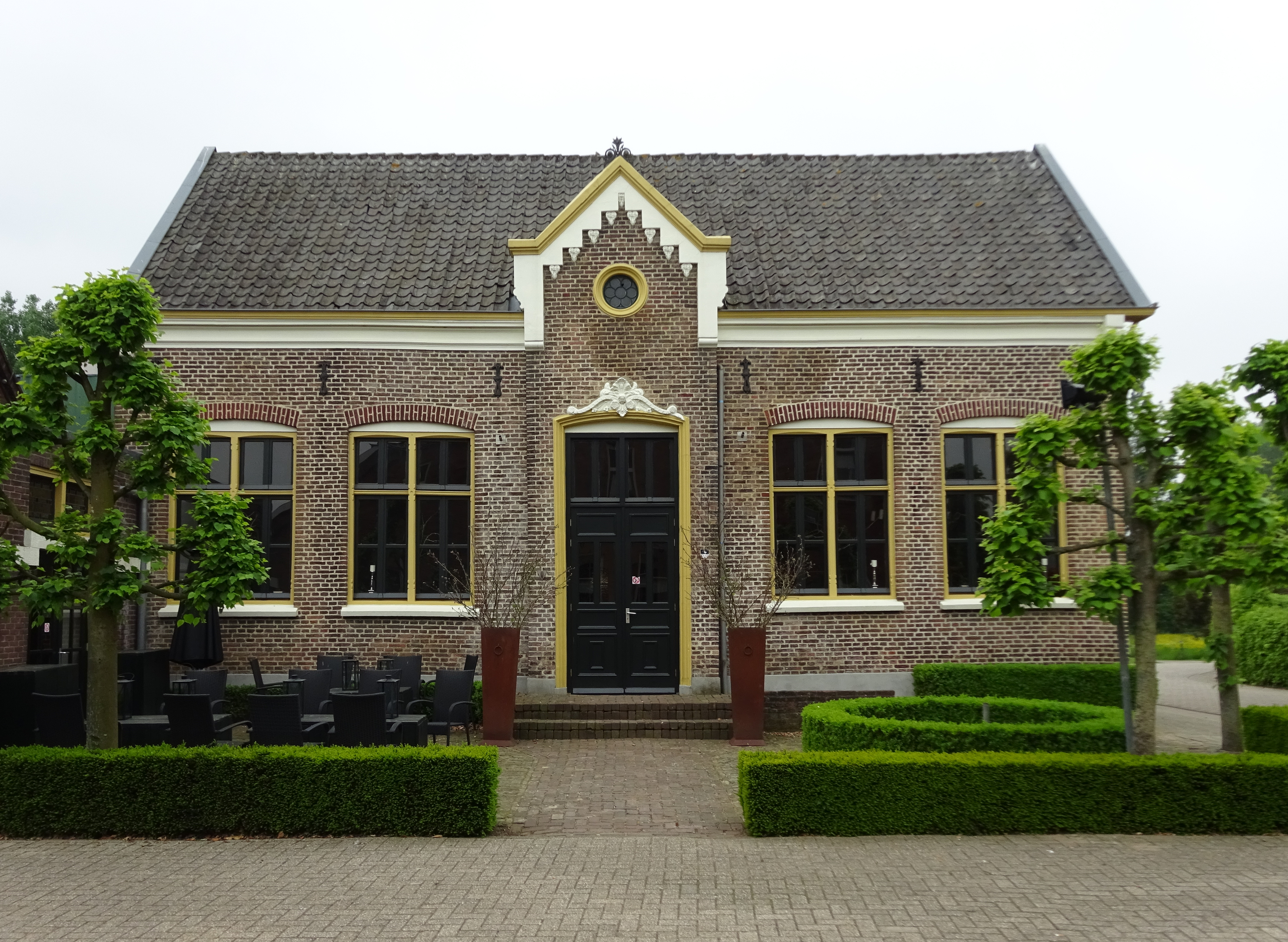
Emmerikseweg 2

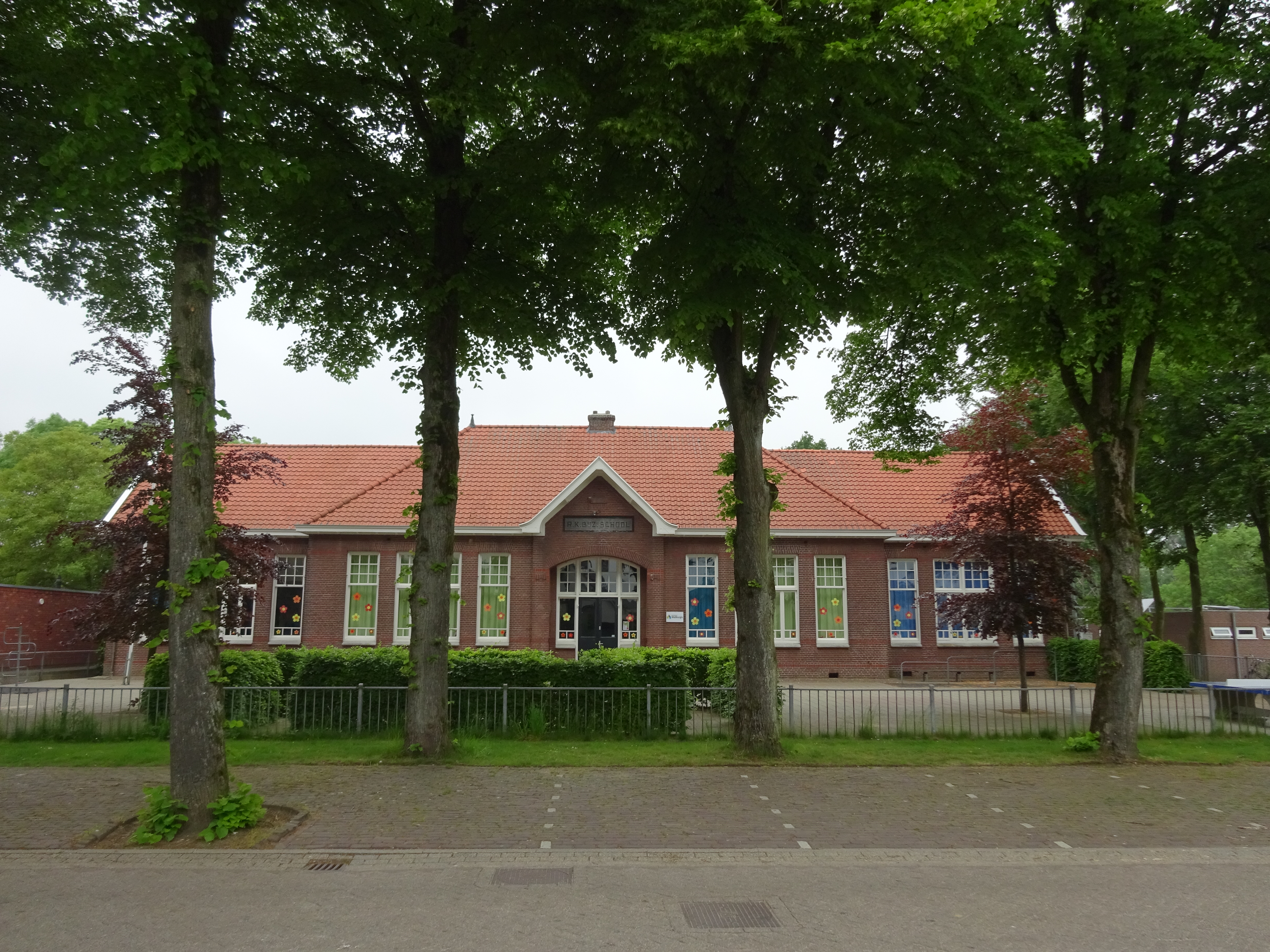
Emmerikseweg 4

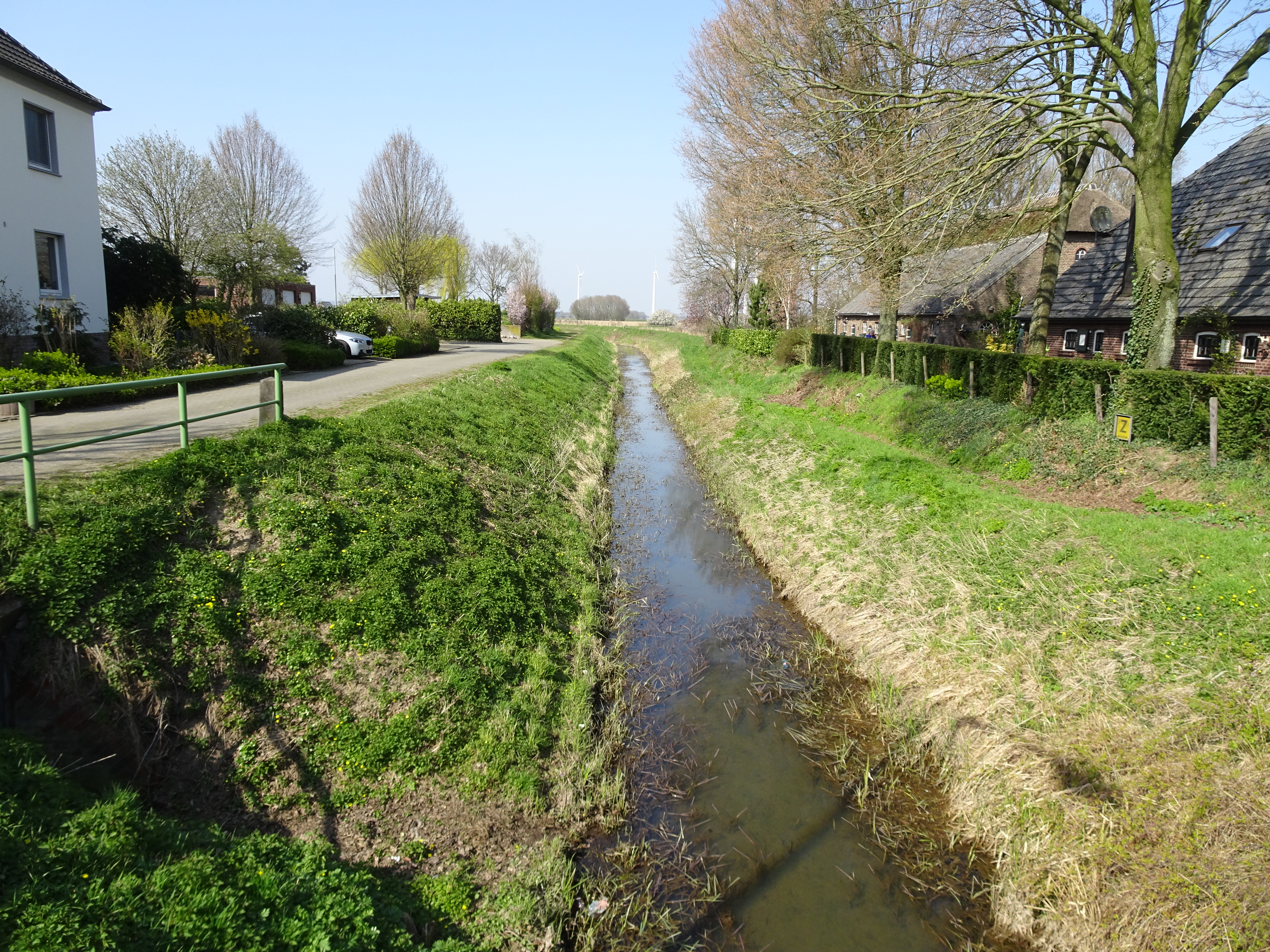
Netterdenscher Kanal

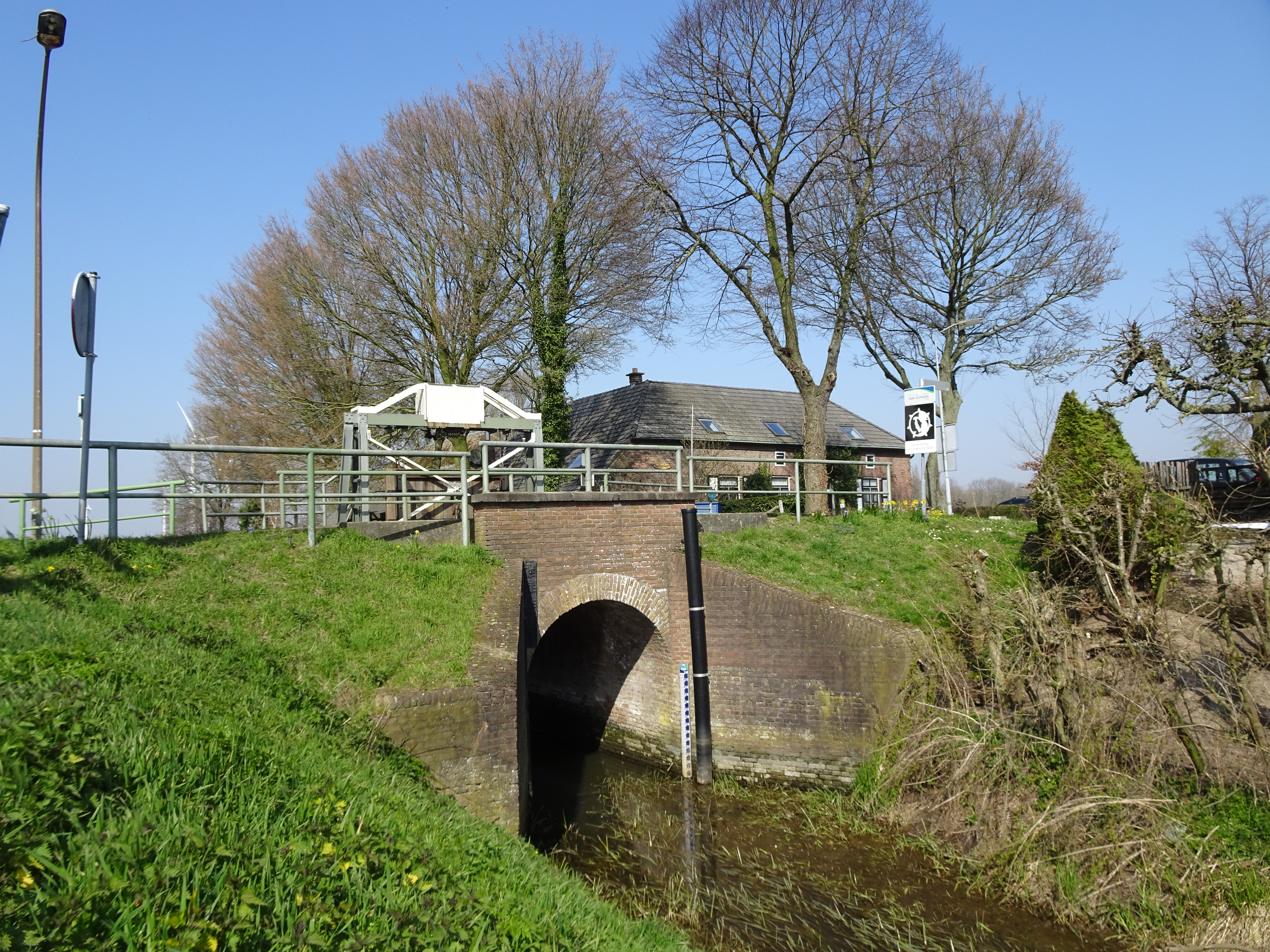
Border canal
