= Katharinenhof Kranenburg =

Building in Kranenburg, North Rhine-Westphalia, Germany

Coordinates: 51°47′20″N 6°00′28″E

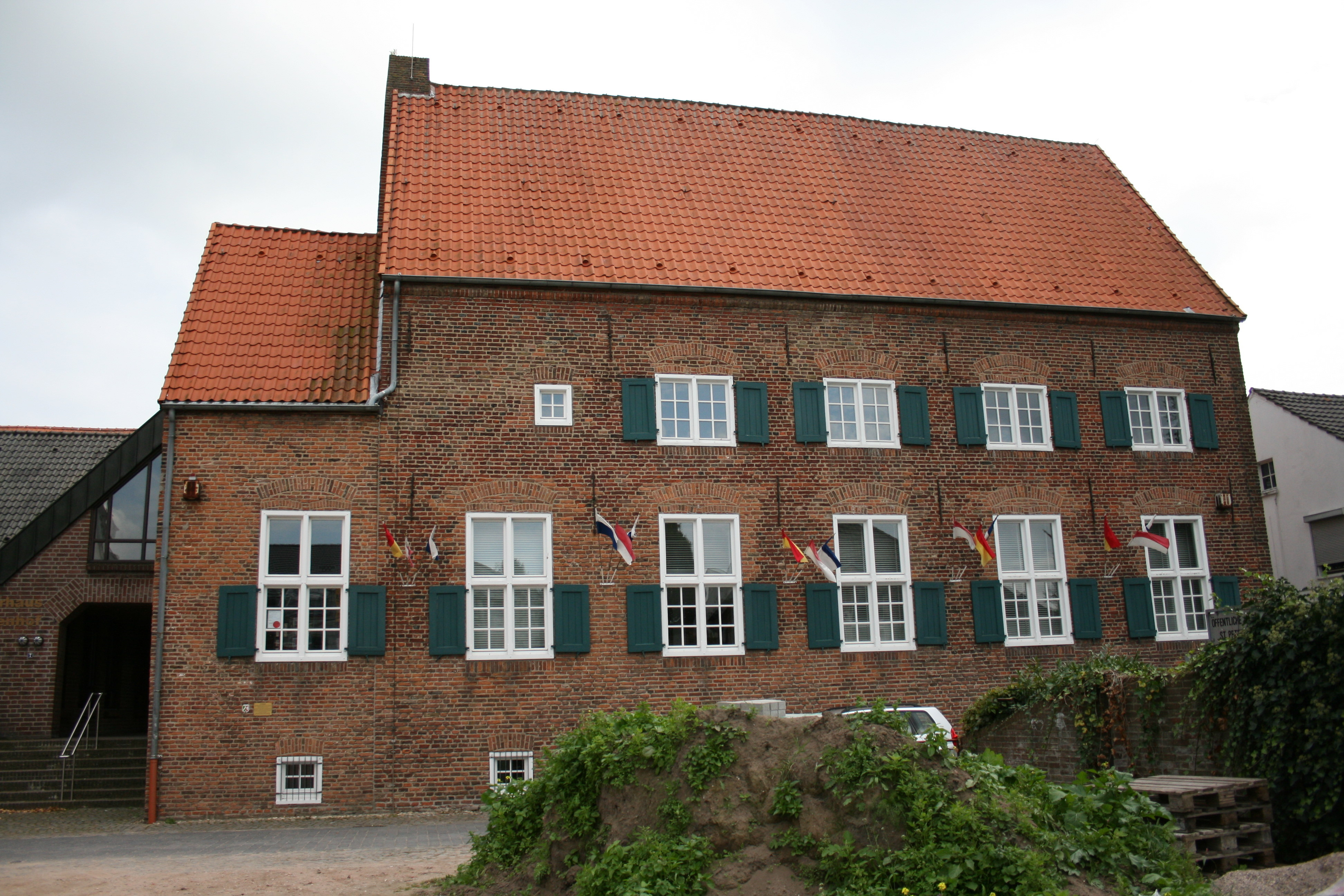
The convent building of the Katharinenhof

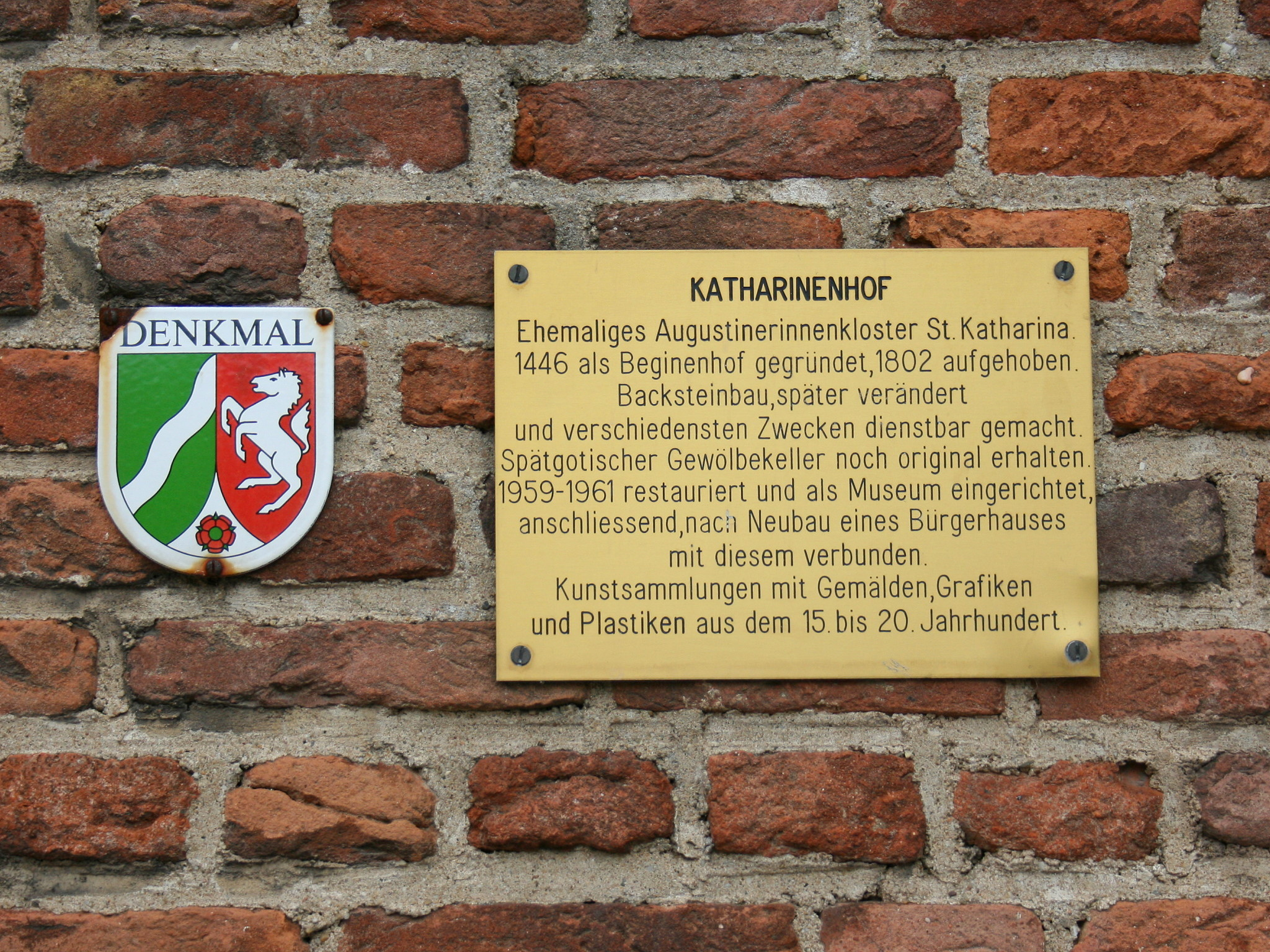
Marking as a monument and short description on the outer wall of the Katharinenhof

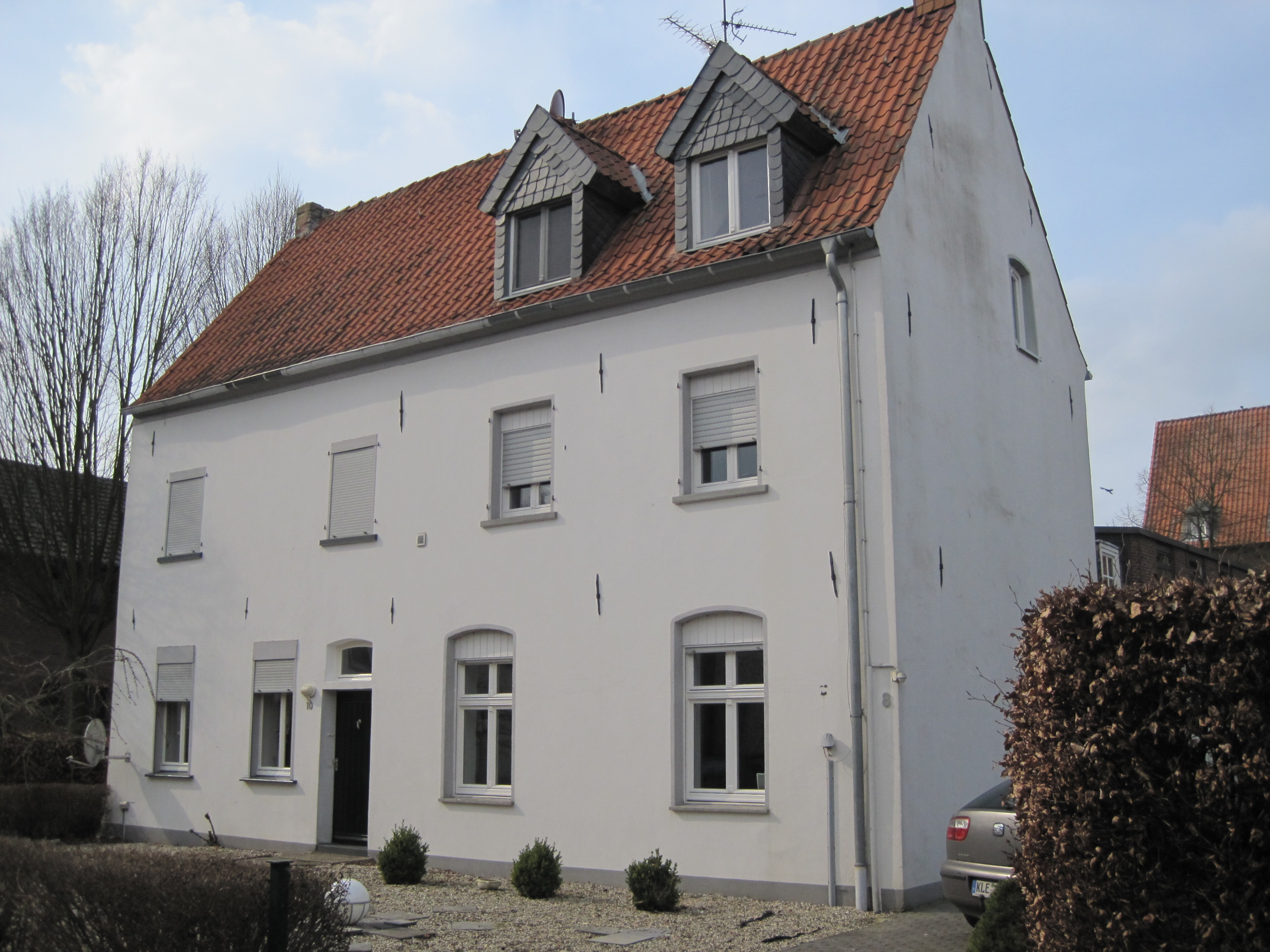
former principal's house

The Katharinenhof in Kranenburg, North Rhine-Westphalia, Germany, was used from 1446 until 1802 as the home of a convent of sisters of the Catholic Church. After that time, the building served various uses. Since 1961, the house serves as a museum.

== History ==
=== Convent of Sisters ===
It was in 1445 that Henrik Housteen, who then was the chef of the kitchen of the duke of Kleve, donated to the nuns the house in the millstreet (Mühlenstraße) in Kranenburg, so that they could found a subsidiary of their convent there. In 1446 the convent moved with the approval of the duke to that house. In 1472 the sisters adopted the Rule of St. Augustine. In 1802 the Katharinen-convent was secularized.

=== Usage of the building after 1802 ===
After the convent was closed, the monastery-building served temporarily as a police office and finally was furbished up to be used as a school-building. During the Drittes Reich it was the accommodation of the NSV-kindergarten.

NSV stands for Nationalistische Volkswohlfahrt. After the Second World War the building, which was only shopworn, was used as a compensatory church. In 1959/1960 the premises were thoroughly renovated. Since 1961 it is the home of the Museum Katharinenhof. Owner of the museum is the Verein Für Heimatschutz 1922 e. V., Kranenburg. In 1984 the building got an outbuilding, which allows for a larger exhibition space of the museum.
