= Wyler, North Rhine-Westphalia =

Village in North Rhine-Westphalia, Germany

Coordinates: 51°48′20″N 5°57′59″E

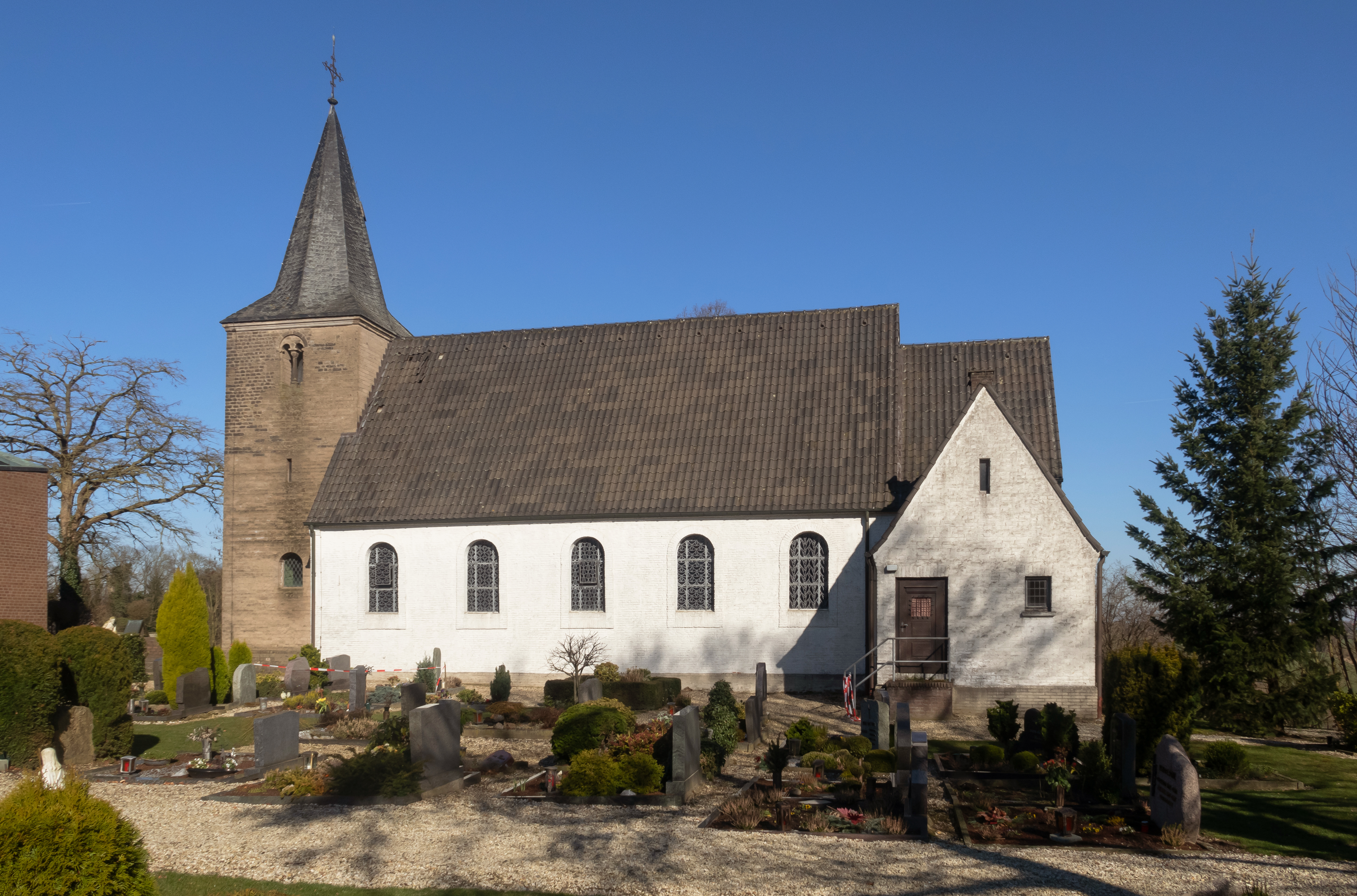
Wyler, church: Sankt Johannes Baptist Kirche

Wyler is a village along the Dutch-German border, 7 km (5 miles) southeast of Nijmegen, Gelderland, The Netherlands, and 5 km (3 miles) west of Kranenburg, Germany.

== Location and population ==
Most of the village is located in the municipality of Kranenburg, North Rhine-Westphalia, Germany. A small part of it lies in the municipality of Berg en Dal, Gelderland, The Netherlands, a few kilometers (miles) from the city of Nijmegen (German: Nimwegen).

The westernmost villages in the municipality of Kranenburg to some extent function as a dormitories for people who work in the Dutch city of Nijmegen.

Population is 525; 441 in the German part, and 84 in the Dutch part.

=== Proximity of Wylerberg ===
Some of the fiercest fighting towards the close of World War II occurred in the vicinity. Wyler lies close to the Wylerberg (Dutch: Duivelsberg; in World War II, known to Allied forces as 'Hill 75.9'), a hill which was formerly in Germany but, together with other territories — subsequently returned — annexed to The Netherlands after World War II.

== Significant building ==
Among significant buildings in Wyler is the Sankt-Johannes-Kirche.

== See also ==
- Kranenburg, North Rhine-Westphalia#Towns and villages in the municipality
- Kleve (district)#Towns and municipalities
- Zyfflich#Location
- Berg en Dal (municipality)#Population centres
- Duivelsberg#Location
- Nijmegen#Proximity of border with Germany
- Dutch annexation of German territory after World War II#Return
- Marinus van der Goes van Naters#German border issues after WW2
