= Zyfflich =

German village near the Dutch border

Coordinates: 51.8239°N 5.9739°E

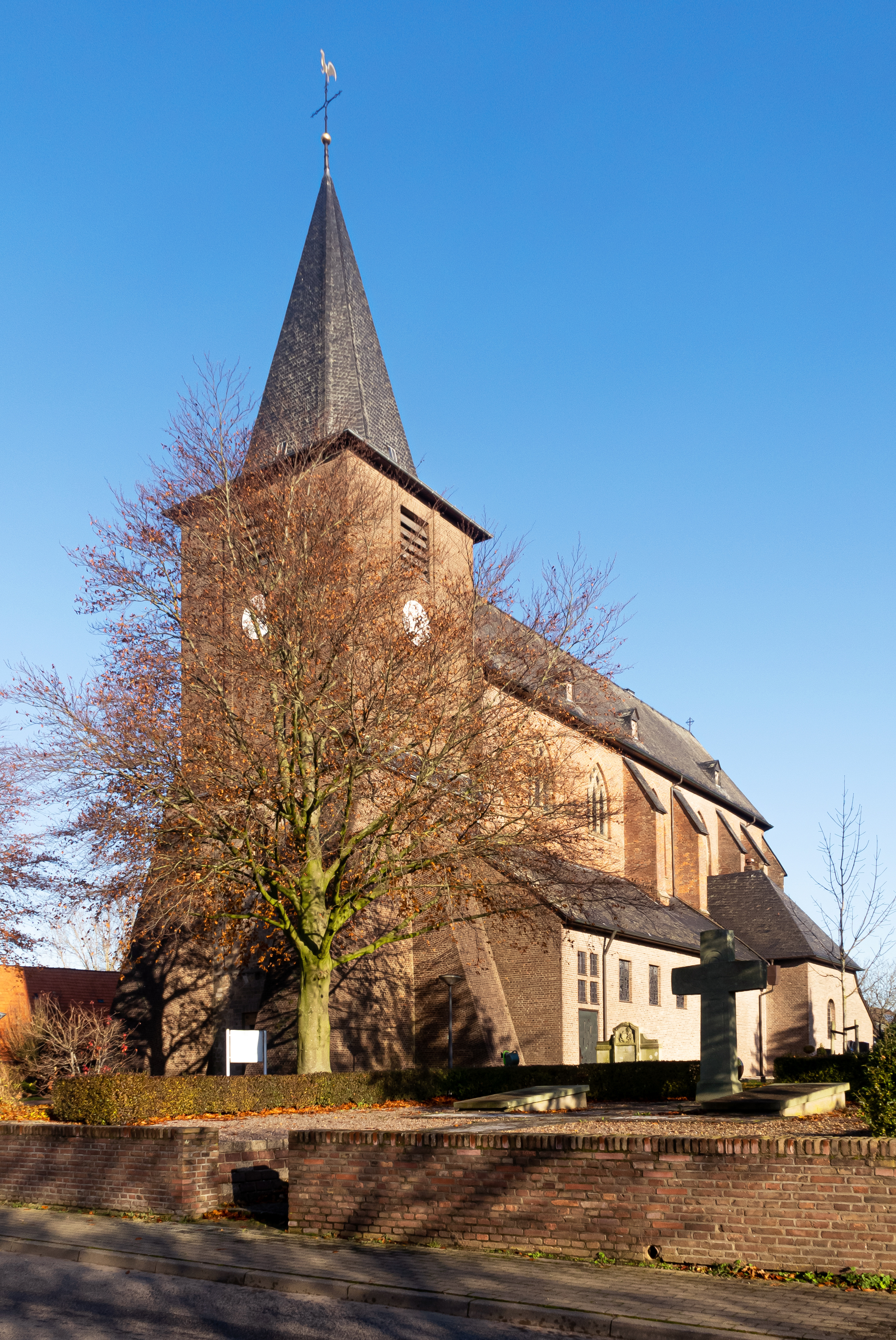
St. Martinskirche (church)

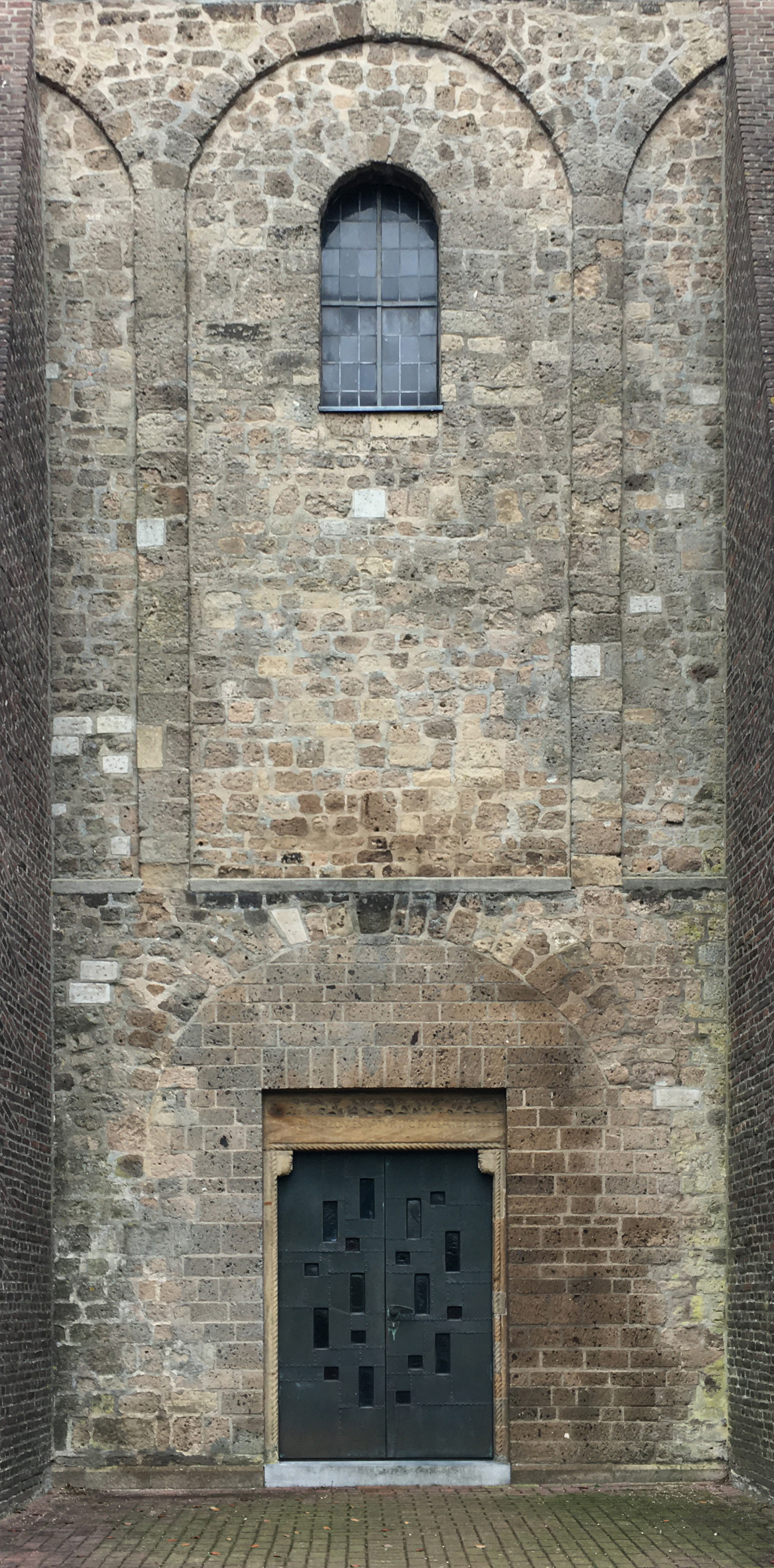
Romanesque part of the tower

Zyfflich (German pronunciation: [ˈt͜sʏflɪç]) is a village in Germany near the Dutch city of Nijmegen in the municipality of Kranenburg, Kreis Kleve in the State of North Rhine-Westphalia.

== Location ==
Like nearby Wyler, Zyfflich lies on the German-Dutch border, a few kilometres from the Dutch city of Nijmegen (German: Nimwegen), in the western extremity of Kranenburg municipality. This municipality has a significant proportion of Dutch nationals resident within its boundaries; and the westernmost villages in the municipality of Kranenburg to some extent function as dormitories for people who work in the Dutch city of Nijmegen.

== Sankt-Martin-Kirche ==
Among significant buildings in Zyfflich is the Sankt-Martin-Kirche. The original part of Sankt-Martin-Kirche is said to date from circa 1010, reputedly the oldest church building in the Kleve district. The building underwent significant alteration and development in the 14th and 15th centuries.

During its long history the structure sustained substantial war damage.

== See also ==
- Kranenburg, North Rhine-Westphalia#Towns and villages in the municipality
- Wyler, North Rhine-Westphalia
- Kleve (district)#Towns and municipalities
- Nijmegen#Proximity of border with Germany
