= Kranenburg, North Rhine-Westphalia =

Kranenburg
- Municipality
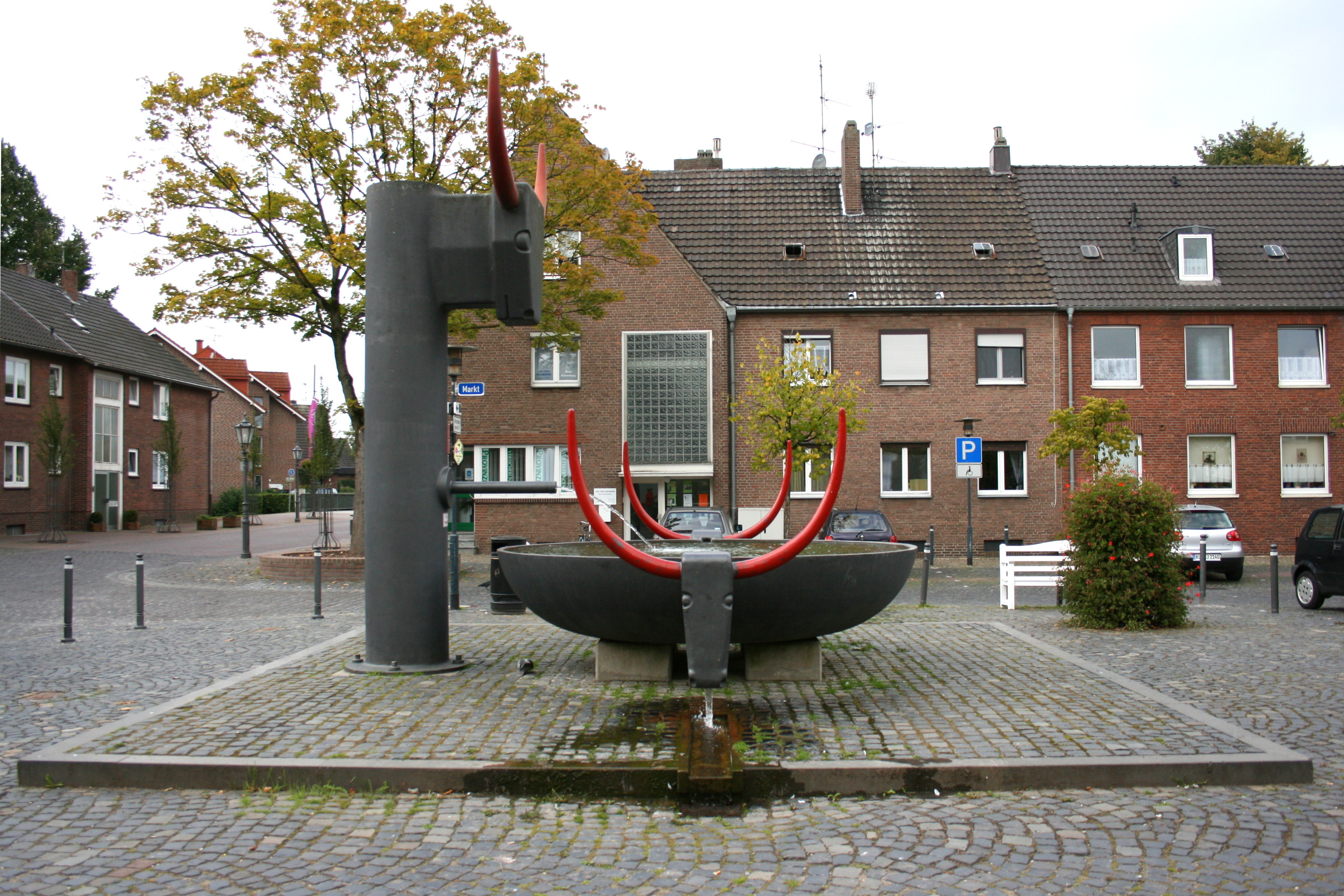

- Coat of arms

- Location of Kranenburg within Kleve district
- Interactive map of Kranenburg
- Location within Germany Location within North Rhine-Westphalia
- Coordinates: 51°47′23″N 6°0′26″E
- Country: Germany
- State: North Rhine-Westphalia
- Admin. region: Düsseldorf
- District: Kleve
- Subdivisions: 9

Government
  - Mayor (2020–25): Ferdi Böhmer (CDU)

Area
  - Total: 76.89 km^{2} (29.69 sq mi)
- Elevation: 21 m (69 ft)

Population (2025-12-31)
  - Total: 11,101
  - Density: 144.4/km^{2} (373.9/sq mi)
- Time zone: UTC+01:00 (CET)
  - Summer (DST): UTC+02:00 (CEST)
- Postal codes: 47559
- Dialling codes: 0 28 26 und 0 28 21
- Vehicle registration: KLE
- Website: www.kranenburg.de

Kranenburg (German pronunciation: [ˈkʁaːnənbʊʁk]) is a municipality in the district of Cleves in the state of North Rhine-Westphalia, Germany. It is located near the border with the Netherlands, 12 kilometres (7 mi) south-east of Nijmegen and 11 kilometres (7 mi) west of Cleves.

Since 1992, Kranenburg has evolved into a commuter town for Nijmegen.

The village has always focused on the Dutch city of Nijmegen, and the local language was Dutch until far into the 19th century.

== Towns and villages in the municipality ==
- Kranenburg
- Nütterden
- Schottheide
- Mehr, including Zelem Castle
- Frasselt
- Zyfflich
- Wyler
- Niel
- Grafwegen

== History ==
=== Middle Ages ===
First records show that Kranenburg was founded in the 13th century by the Baron of Kleve. The first castle was built in 1270 and the first church a few years later by Dietrichs Luf von Kleve († 1277). In 1294, the village raised to the status of town. In 1308 "The Miraculous Trinity" ("Wundertätige Dreifaltigkeit") was found, establishing Kranenburg as a place of pilgrimage. According to legend, a one-legged priest went into the forest after church and a divine revelation came upon him. Overcome by the power of the Holy Spirit, the priest fell asleep under a tree. The next day, he woke up to find that God had given him two additional legs. At the tree where he had slept, the Miraculous Trinity now stands, functioning as a memorial to the now three-legged priest.

In 1370, the county Land Kranenburg came into the possession of the von Kleve family line again, after it had been leased to Gerhard I knight, Lord of Horne and Weert, Lord of Perweys, Lord of Herlaer, and later his son, the bishop Dietrich. During this time the town got its first fortifications. At the end of the 15th century, a new castle, substantial stone fortifications with 2 gates and an unknown number of towers were erected. The southernmost of these towers acted as the town windmill (Stadtwindmühle). The town bloomed most prosperously during the first half of the 15th century, which resulted in the construction of the large, Gothic St. Peter und Paul church. In 1436, the St. Martins Priory was moved to Kranenburg from Zyfflich, followed in 1445/46 by the Augustinian women's nunnery Katharinenhof Kranenburg, which was established in the Kranenburger Mühlenstraße as an axillary branch of the Klever Nunnery of Mount Sion (Schwesternhauses vom Berg Sion). After a fierce religious feud over the new prince bishop within the Münster Cathedral Chapter since 1450, the Kranenburger Treaty was signed in Kranenburg in 1457, assigning John II of Pfalz-Simmern as the new prince bishop.

=== Early Renaissance ===
Multiple town fires and floods diminished the prosperity that Kranenburg had known during the Middle Ages. With the end of the hereditary lineage of the Duchy of Jülich-Kleve-Bergischen in 1609, county Kranenburg and the Duchy of Cleves became the property of lords of Brandenburg-Prussia. In 1675, Frederick William, Elector of Brandenburg (16 February 1620 – 29 April 1688) gave Kranenburg to his personal physician, Arnold Fey. After his death in 1678, Kranenburg returned into the possession of the family of Brandenburg-Prussia. Around 1650, the "reformed congregation" of Kranenburg was founded, and got a small church in 1723. The historic town hall was destroyed completely by fire in 1789. In 1800, the then derelict town gates were demolished.

=== 19th and 20th century ===
During the Napoleonic Wars and subsequent French occupation, Kranenburg was a separate canton within the Roer département and temporary the most northern location of the Napoleonic Empire. At the same time, it however lost its town privileges. In 1802, the Order of St. Martin and the St. Catherine convent became secular. After the Vienna Convention, the counties of Kranenburg, Nütterden und Frasselt-Schottheide grounded the community (Bürgermeisterei) of Kranenburg. Later, in 1936, Grafwegen, that previously belonged to Kessel, was added to the administrative community of Kranenburg. Kranenburg remained a mainly agricultural community until far into the 20th century.

=== Kranenburg during World War II ===
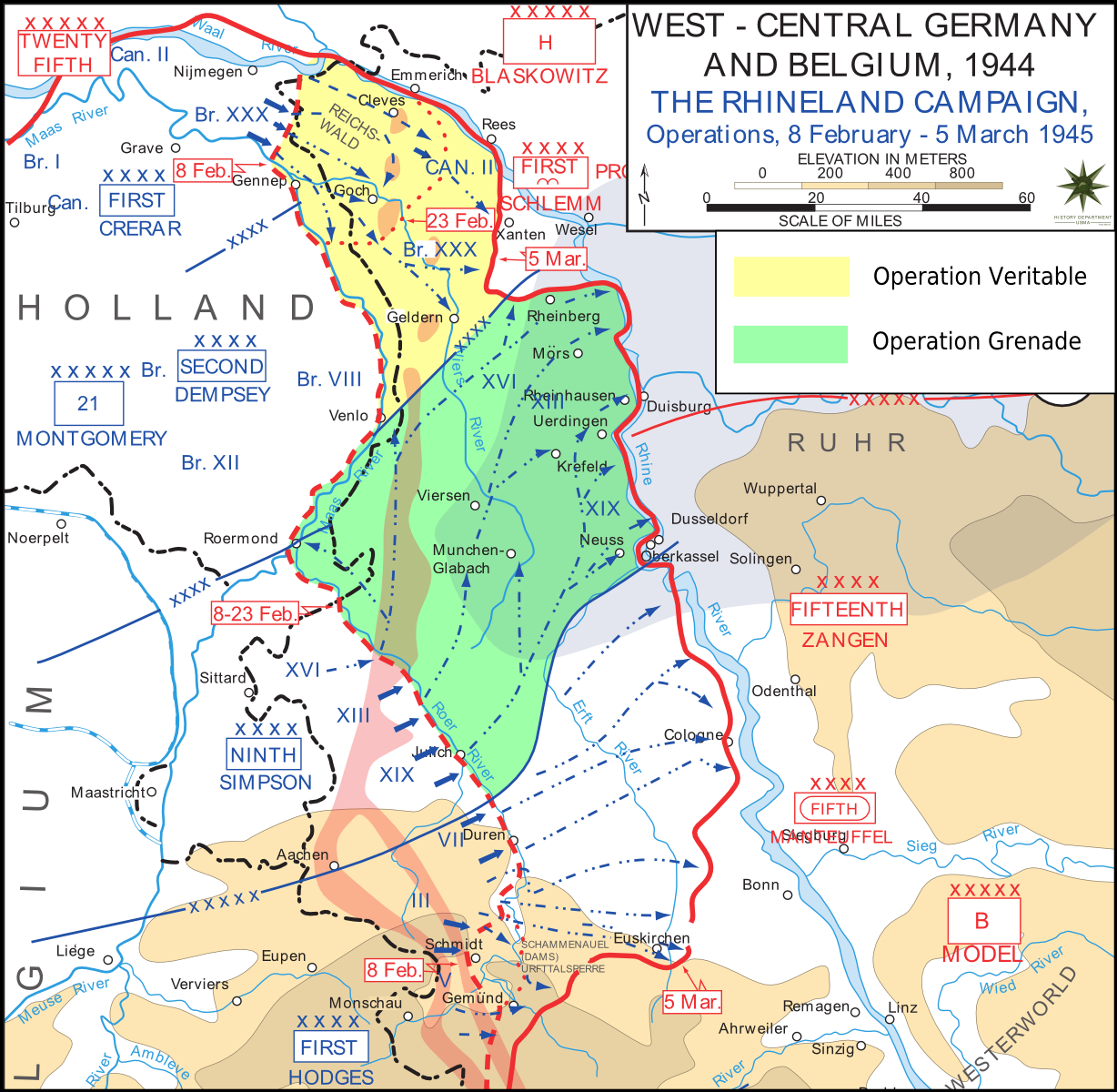
8 February - 11 March 1945: Operations Veritable and Blockbuster (yellow) and Grenade (green)

During the winter of 1944 -1945, the town of Kranenburg found itself in the middle of heavy fighting. In the nearby Klever Reichswald and the surroundings of the nowadays village of Kranenburg, Operation Veritable, also known as the Battle of the Reichswald took place. Taking place from 8 February till 11 March 1945, Operation Veritable was a part of General Dwight Eisenhower's "broad front" strategy to occupy the west bank of the Rhine, before attempting any crossing, conquest of the Ruhrgebiet industrial area, and eventual push towards Berlin. Veritable was originally called Valediction and had been planned originally for execution in early January, 1945. One day after the start of Operation Veritable on the 8th, the Germans blew the gates out of the largest of the Roer dams, sending water surging down the valley. The next day they added to the flooding by doing the same to dams further up stream on the Roer and the Urft. The river rose at two feet an hour and the valley downstream to the Meuse stayed flooded for about two weeks.

=== Modern-day Kranenburg ===
After the Second World War, the counties of Wyler and Zyfflich were added to the administrative community Kranenburg. After the 1st North Rhine Westphalia Communal Reformation Program (1. kommunalen Neugliederungsprogramm) of 1 July 1969, the country of Kranenburg existed out of the communities of:

- Kranenburg
- Nütterden
- Frasselt
- Schottheide
- Grafwegen
- Mehr
- Niel
- Wyler
- Zyfflich

At present day, the community of Kranenburg is a border town within a Europe "without borders". With the introduction the European Union and subsequent EU internal market without boundaries, many Dutch moved from the Netherlands to Kranenburg in Germany, attracted by economic motives, e.g. low real estate prices/ taxes. This resulted in a massive influx increase of more than 200% between 1992 and 2008, growing the total population of the small community dramatically. Although, German authorities suggest diplomatically to "steer" this influx by "handing out permits selectively", migration away from the area by its original German citizens, and "enclave formation" of "Dutch-only" clusters is already observed. This, according to international publications of the Centre for Border Research (NCBR) of the nearby located University of Nijmegen, is mainly caused by the refusal of the Dutch migrants to integrate/ participate in German society. Based on their observations, the investigators conclude that 100% of the life of these Dutch migrants lies across the border in the Netherlands, although their residence lies in Germany, solely out of financial motives. Hence, for example Dutch parents selectively send their children to Dutch schools, Dutch physicians and hospitals are visited, Dutch sporting and social organisations are joined, Dutch media are read, watched, and listened to. Many do not speak the German language, and don't make any effort to acquire German language skills. Illustratively, the Dutch are reported "to drive back to the Netherlands to buy a jar of peanut butter".

In their conclusions, the authors observe that this refusal of the Dutch to integrate, participate, and contribute to their new German community contrasts strongly with the current Dutch public opinion, political climate, or indeed legislation. In 2012, the Dutch political climate, and the apparent support of Dutch Prime Minister Mark Rutte, was discussed and condemned by the European Union. Since 2023 national election, this has become more apparent with the right-wing to far-right Party for Freedom (PVV), led by Geert Wilders, known for his right-wing populism, anti-immigration, opposition to Islam and Euroscepticism., becoming the largest governing party in Dutch Parliament.

Dutch legislation, the Integration law for immigrants to the Netherlands Act, obliges migrants entering the Netherlands to integrate into Dutch society. To measure this, migrants are subjected to courses and a final exam, determining the migrants' ability to speak the Dutch language and general knowledge of Dutch society. Failure to pass the exam (e.g. inability to speak Dutch) results in expulsion. Participation in this exam is only required of non-EU nationals. Although public sentiments and opinions vary considerably, as for the whole EEC territory, the German conditions of residence for non EU nationals are very similar to those in the Netherlands. After the draft and enforcement of a double tax treaty between the Netherlands and Germany, many Dutch have migrated back to the Netherlands following cultural and financial changes.

== Population ==
Historical population

Year	Pop.	±% p.a.
1965	7,290	—
1970	7,801	+1.36%
1975	7,860	+0.15%
1980	7,842	−0.05%
1985	7,882	+0.10%
1990	7,957	+0.19%
1995	8,526	+1.39%

Year	Pop.	±% p.a.
2000	9,282	+1.71%
2005	9,845	+1.18%
2010	9,963	+0.24%
2015	10,648	+1.34%
2020	10,981	+0.62%
2025	11,101	+0.22%

Source: Landesdatabank Nordrhein-Westfalen

=== Gallery ===
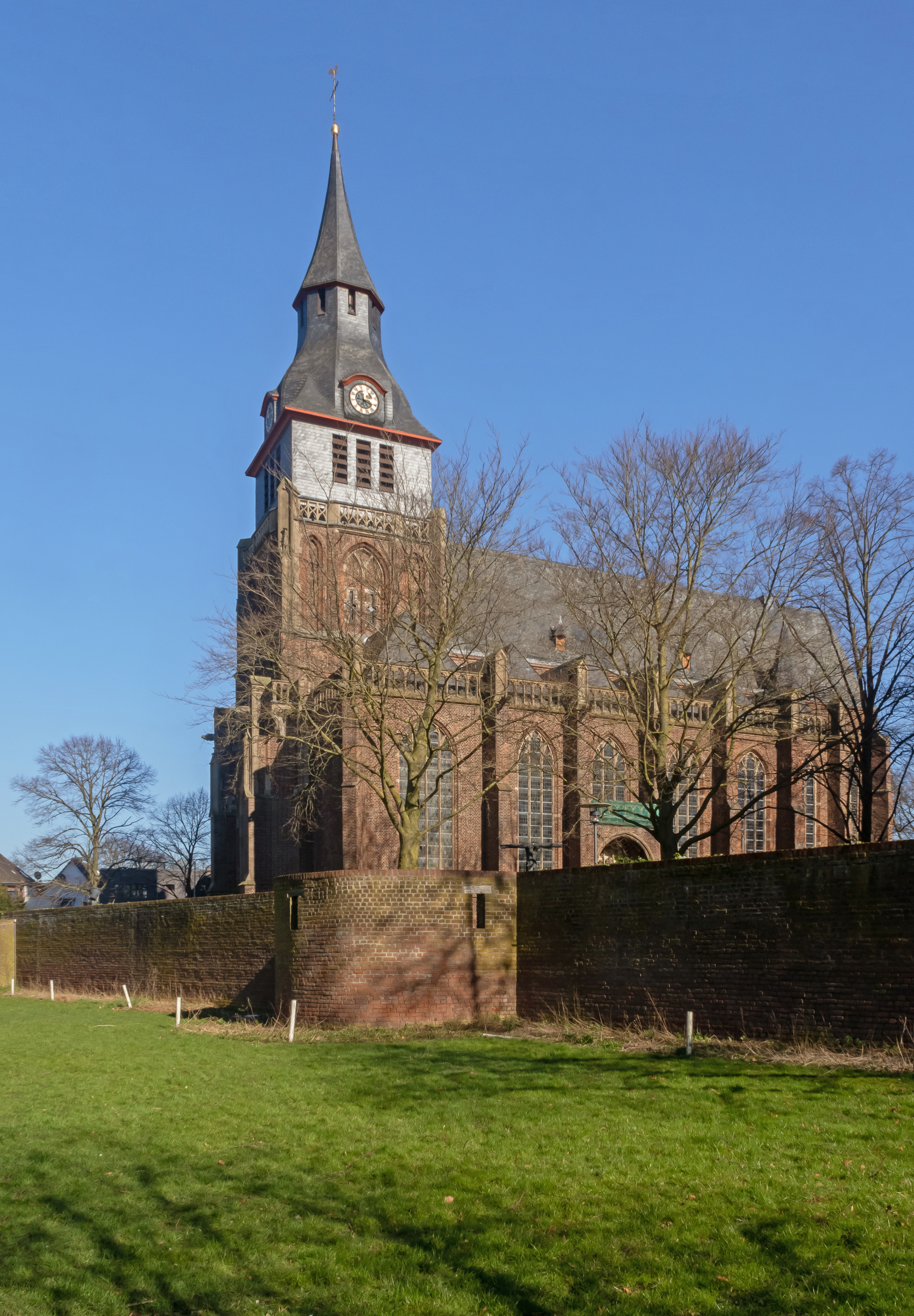
Kranenburg, catholic church: Pfarrkirche Kranenburg

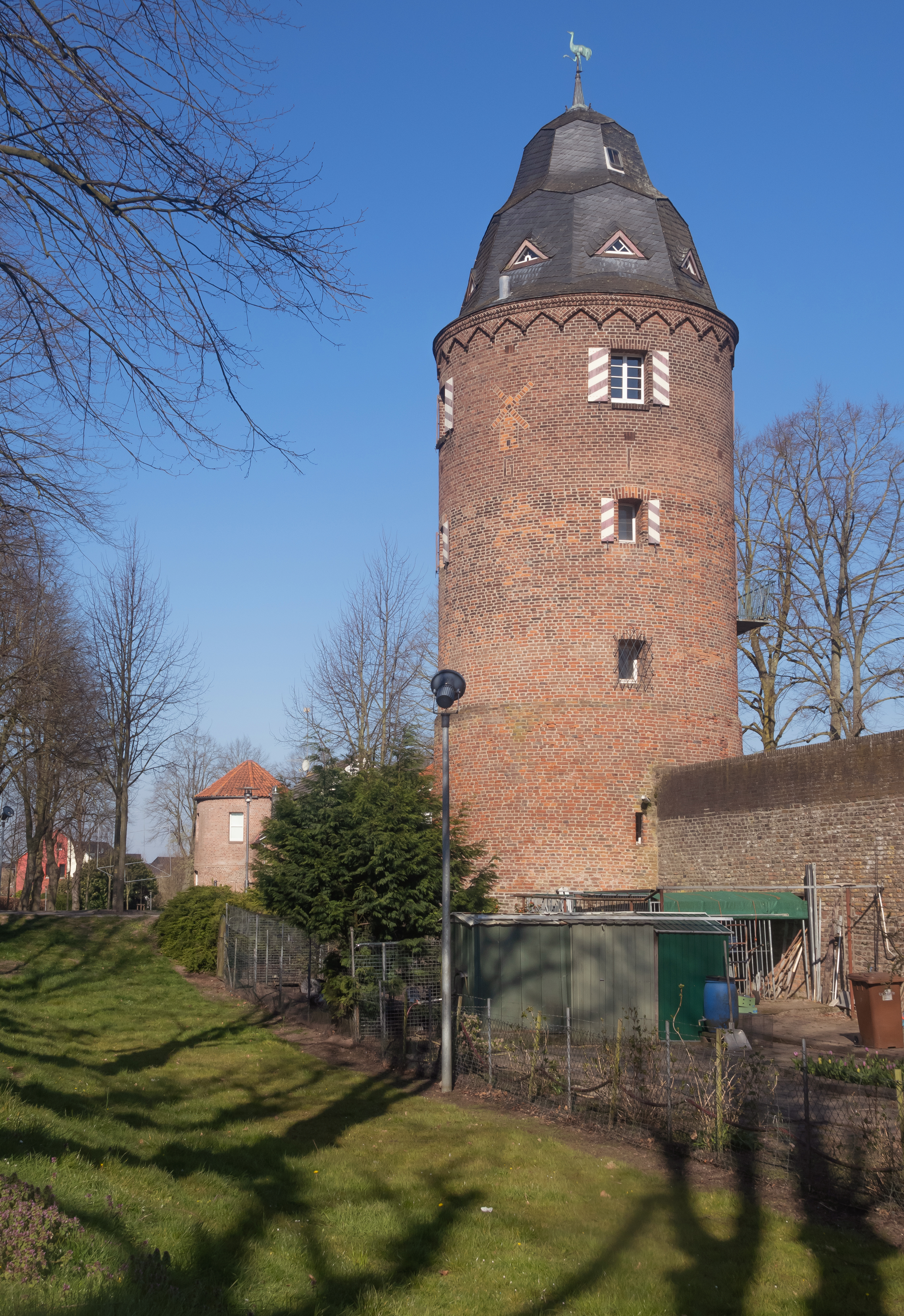
Kranenburg, tower: the Mühlenturm

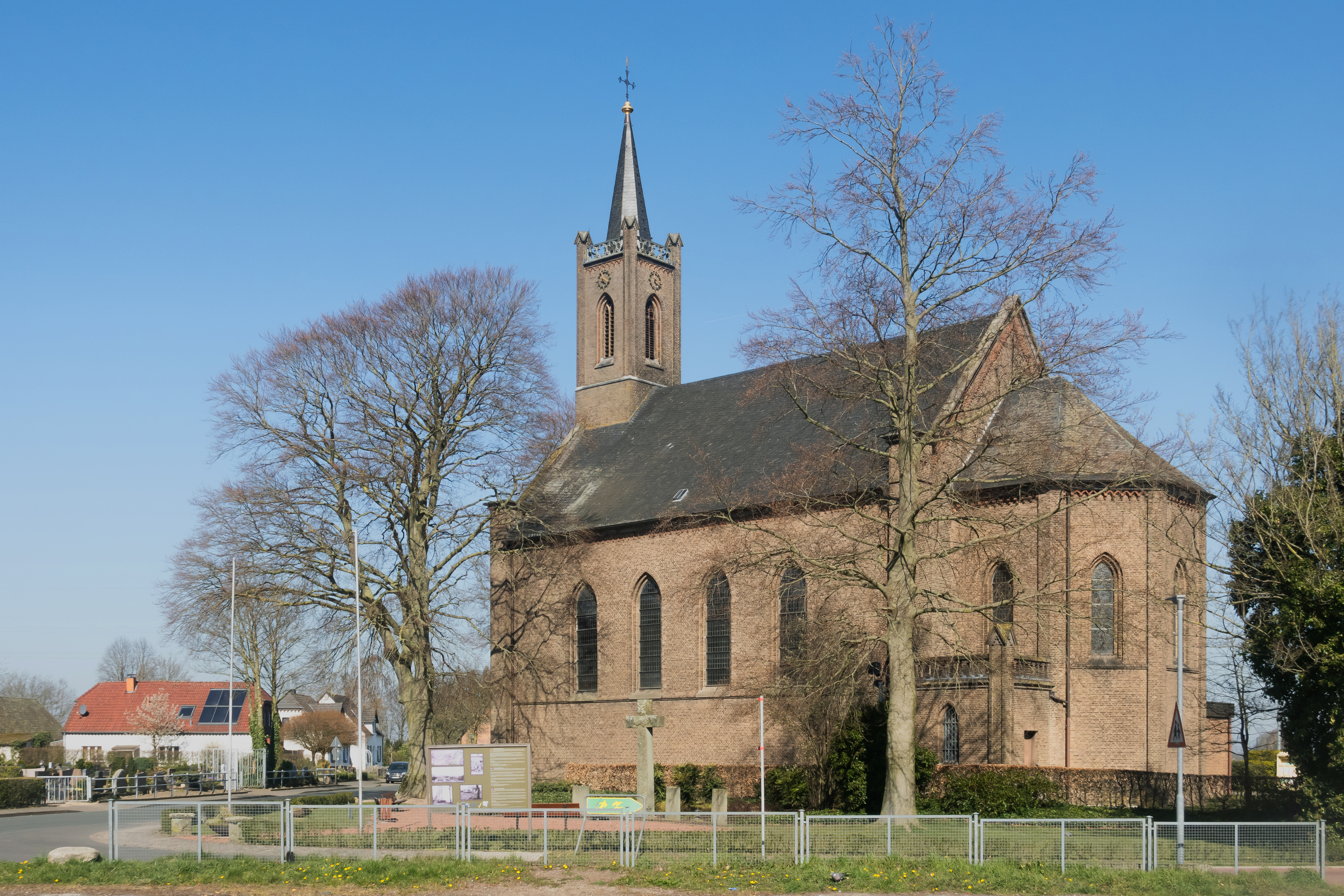
Nütterden, catholic church: Pfarrkirche

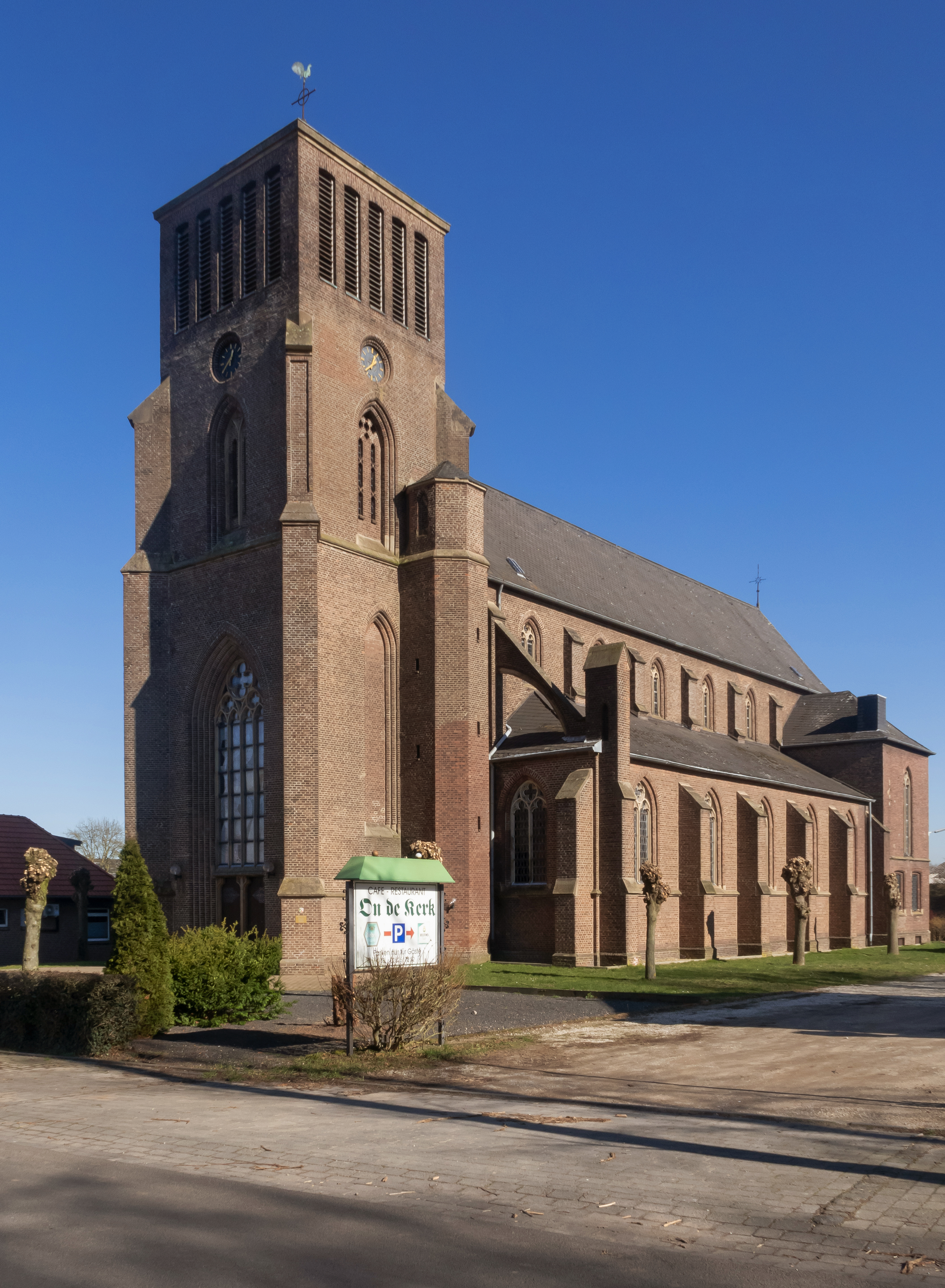
Frasselt, catholic church: Pfarrkirche Frasselt

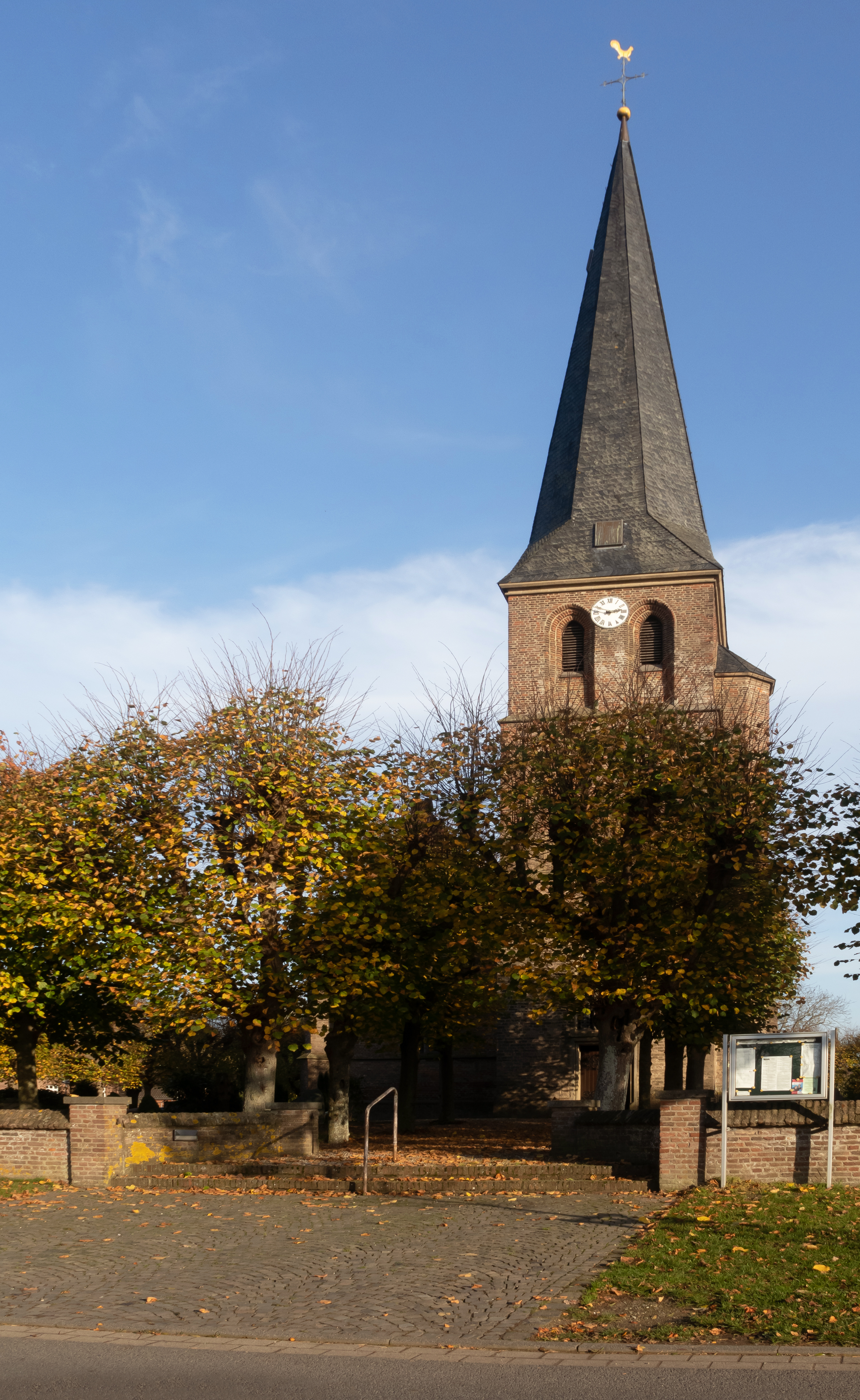
Niel, church: Sankt Bonifatiuskirche

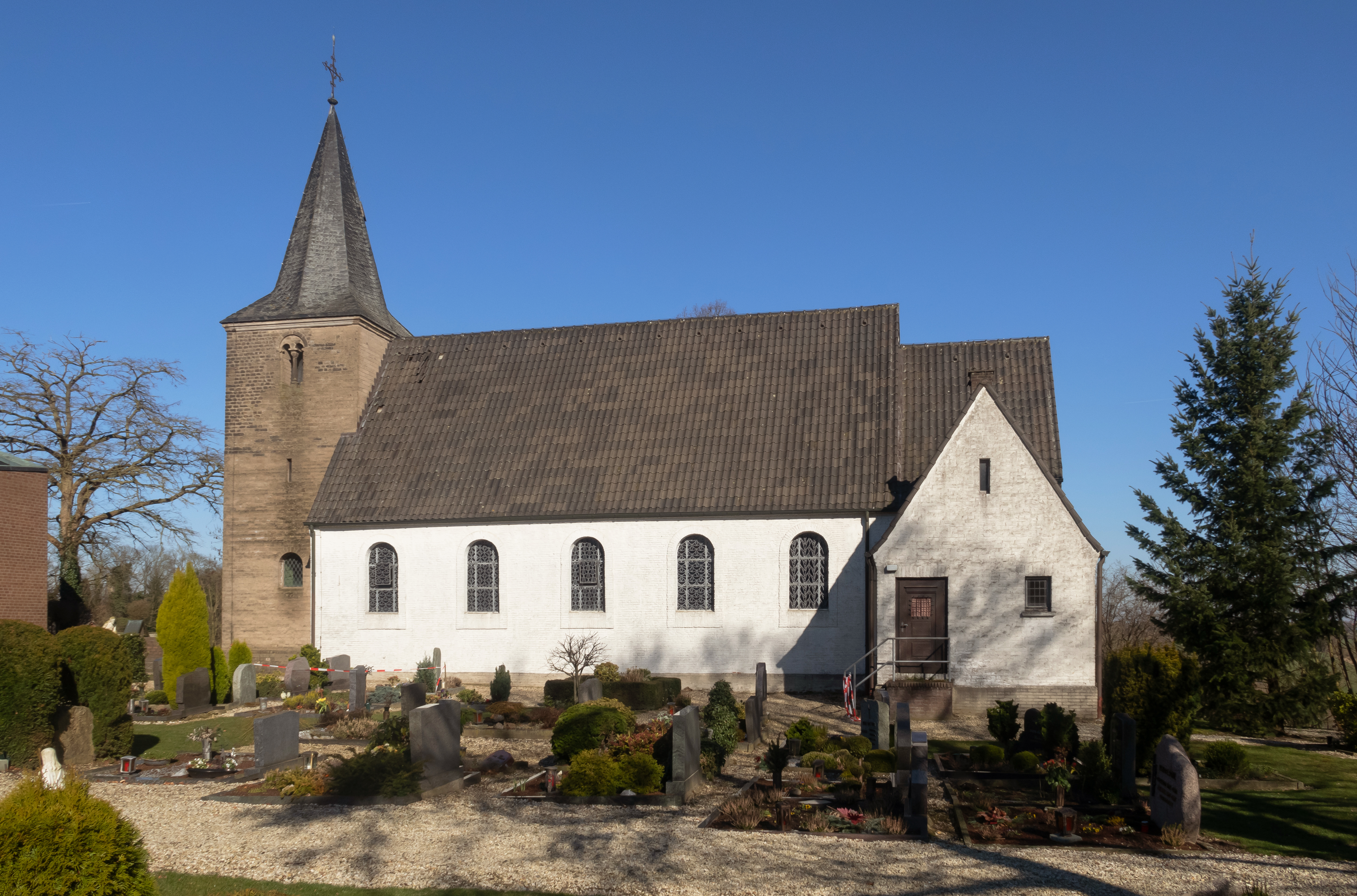
Wyler, catholic church: Pfarrkirche Wyler

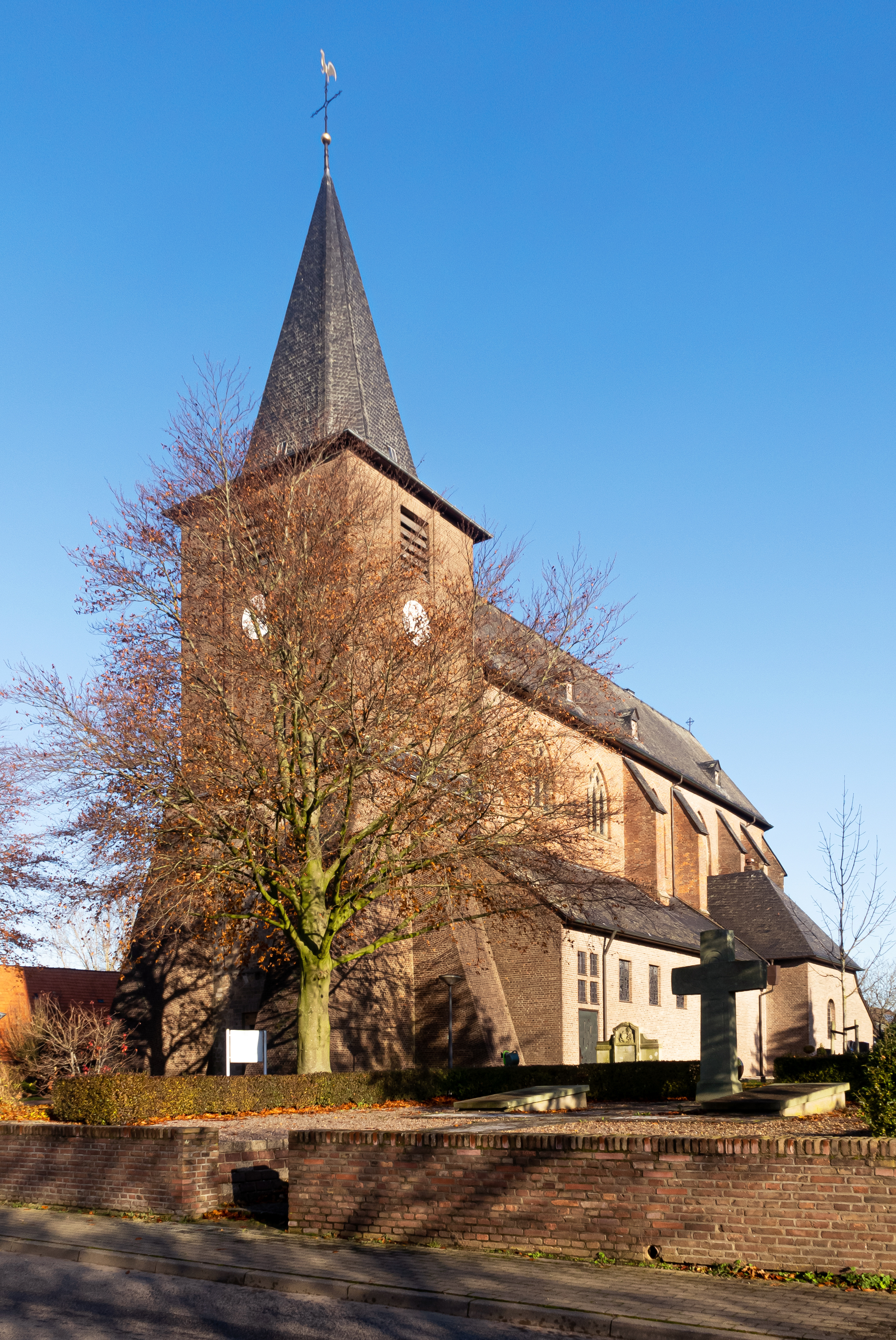
Zyfflich, church: Sankt Martinskirche

== Notable people ==
Born in Kranenburg:

- Alexander von Spaen (1619-1692), Prussian field marshal
