= Zelem Castle =

Coordinates: 51°49′06″N 6°01′53″E

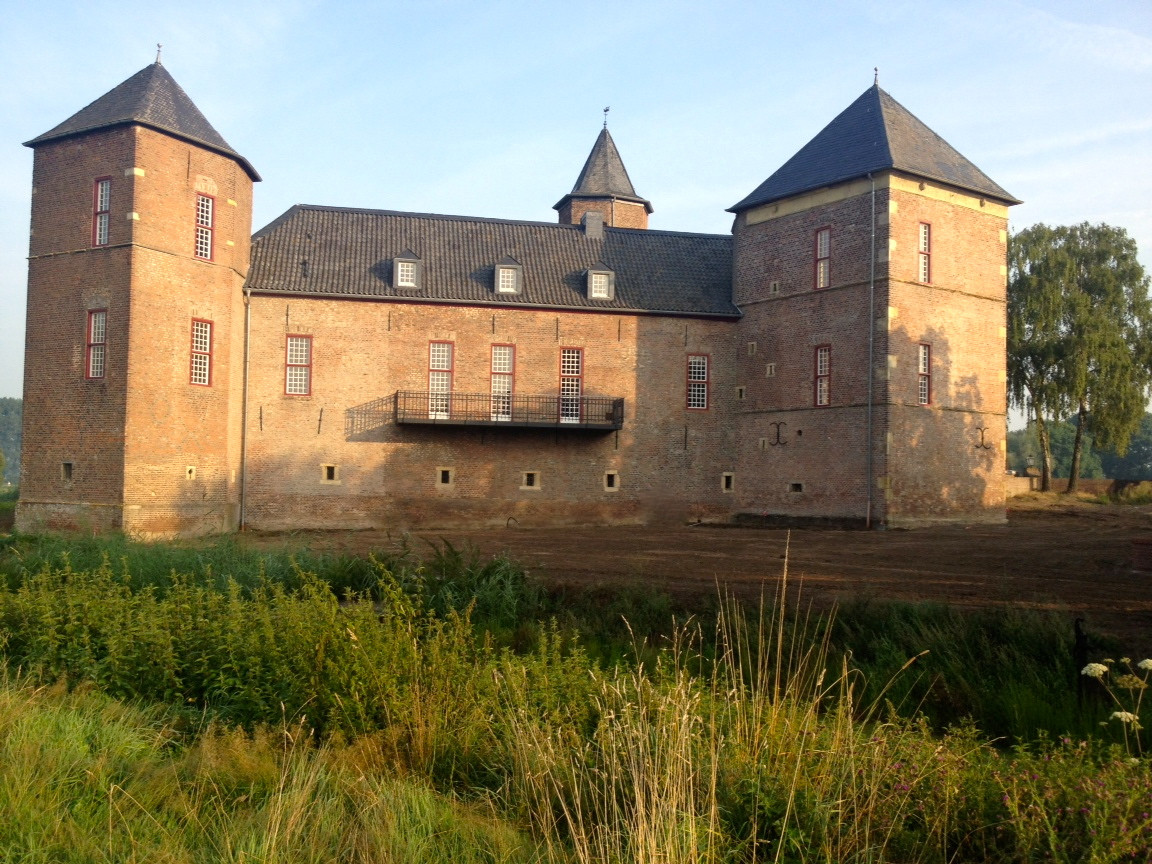
Burg Zelem

Burg Zelem or Zelem Castle (also Selhem, Selem or Zelm) was a knight's moated fortress located in the lowland areas left of the Rhine River between the villages Mehr and Niel in the present Gemeinde of Kranenburg.

== History ==
Zelem was mentioned for the first time in the 12th century as a property of Echternach Abbey. In the first half of the 14th century, Zelem belonged to the Counts of Kranenburg but was sold in 1348 to the lords of Groesbeek. In the 15th century, the Palant-Wylich family became the owners of the estate, in whose hands it remained for centuries. The castle remains privately owned and can therefore only be viewed from the outside.

== Architectural history ==
The castle's basic fabric comes mainly from the first half of the 15th century. In the middle of the 16th century it was rebuilt in Renaissance style. The former three-storey building includes two corner towers formerly equipped with canopies, one of which was decorated with a frieze with sandstone ornaments, mythical creatures, human heads, and a stair tower. The Renaissance portal is adorned with the emblem of the Palant family and the date 1464.

Inside the house is a barrel-vaulted basement, a tower room with a star vault, and a fireplace from the Renaissance. By 1800, the basic structure had been significantly reduced, and the fortification, except for the main wing, was dismantled.

== Literature ==
- Hans-Peter Hilger: Kreis Kleve V. Kranenburg - Zyfflich, Düsseldorf 1970 (Die Denkmäler des Rheinlandes 7), pp. 48-51
- Verein für Heimatschutz (ed.): Kranenburg. Ein Heimatbuch, Kranenburg 1984
