= Nütterden =

Coordinates: 51.7894°N 6.0642°E

Nütterden is a village in the municipality of Kranenburg, Kreis Kleve in the German State of North Rhine-Westphalia.

== Noted structure ==
A noted structure in the village is the St. Antoniuskirche, executed in Neo-Gothic style, the tower of which is conspicuous in the locally flat landscape. In 1853 a structure replaced a smaller chapel dating from the 15th century.

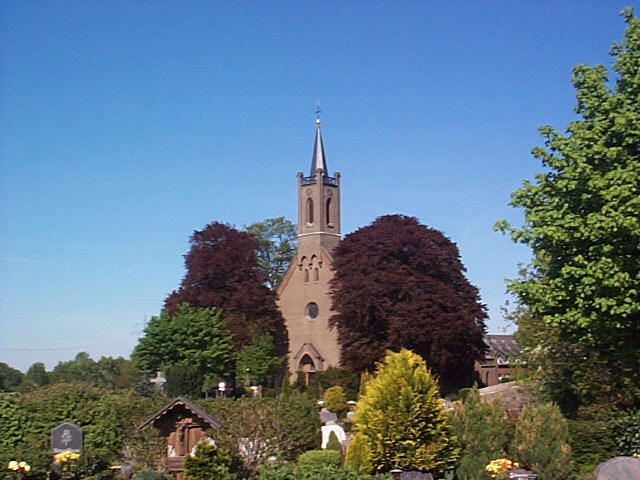
St. Antoniuskirche (church)

== See also ==
- Kranenburg, North Rhine-Westphalia#Towns and villages in the municipality
- Kleve (district)#Towns and municipalities
