= Frasselt =

Village in Germany

Coordinates: 51.7719°N 6.0231°E

Frasselt is a village in the municipality of Kranenburg, Kreis Kleve in the German State of North Rhine-Westphalia.

== Gallery ==
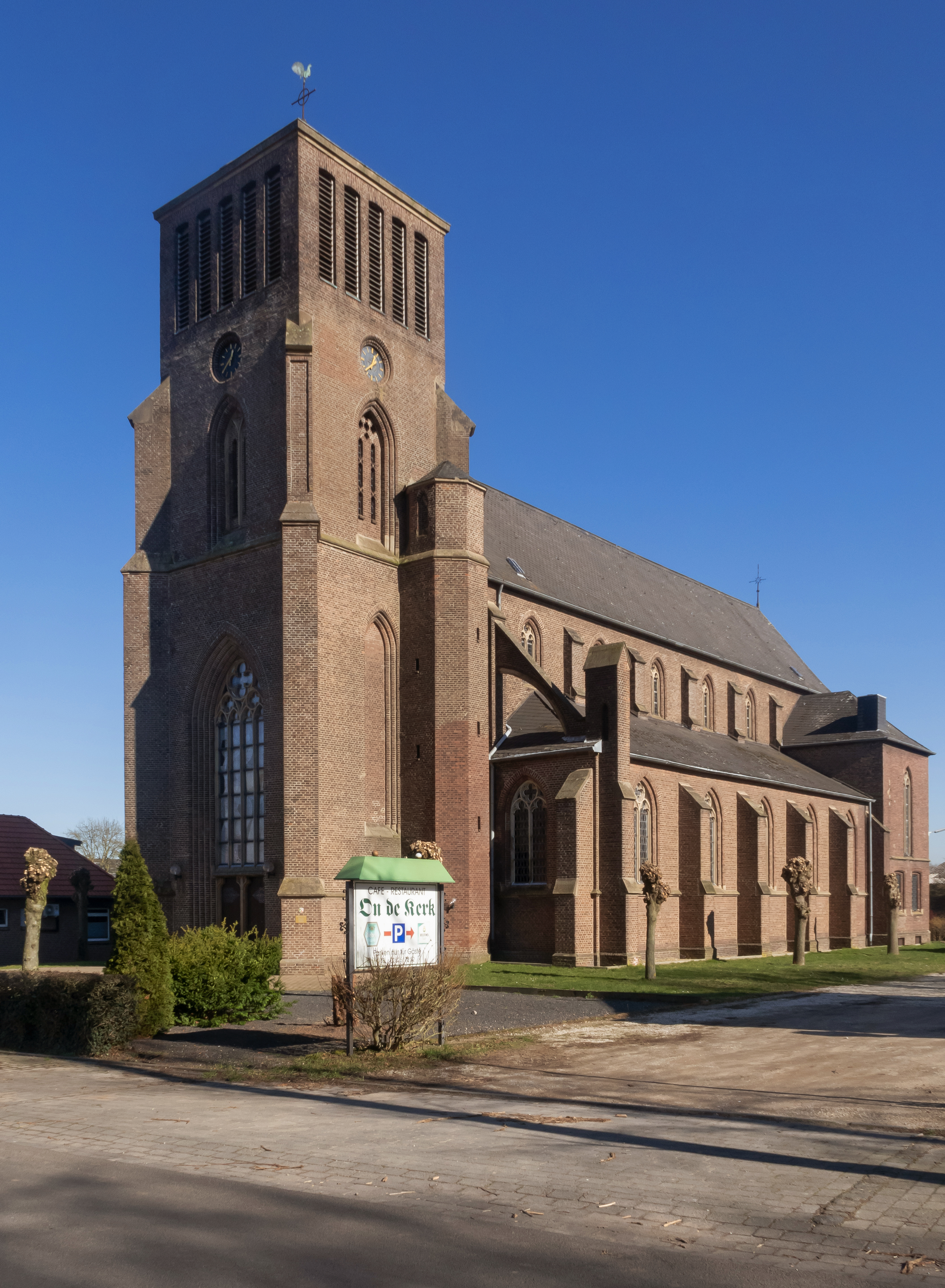
St. Antoniuskirche (church)
