= Wereldmuseum =

Wereldmuseum may refer to:

- Wereldmuseum Amsterdam
- Wereldmuseum Leiden
- Wereldmuseum Rotterdam
