= Nationaal Museum van Wereldculturen =

Dutch museum organization

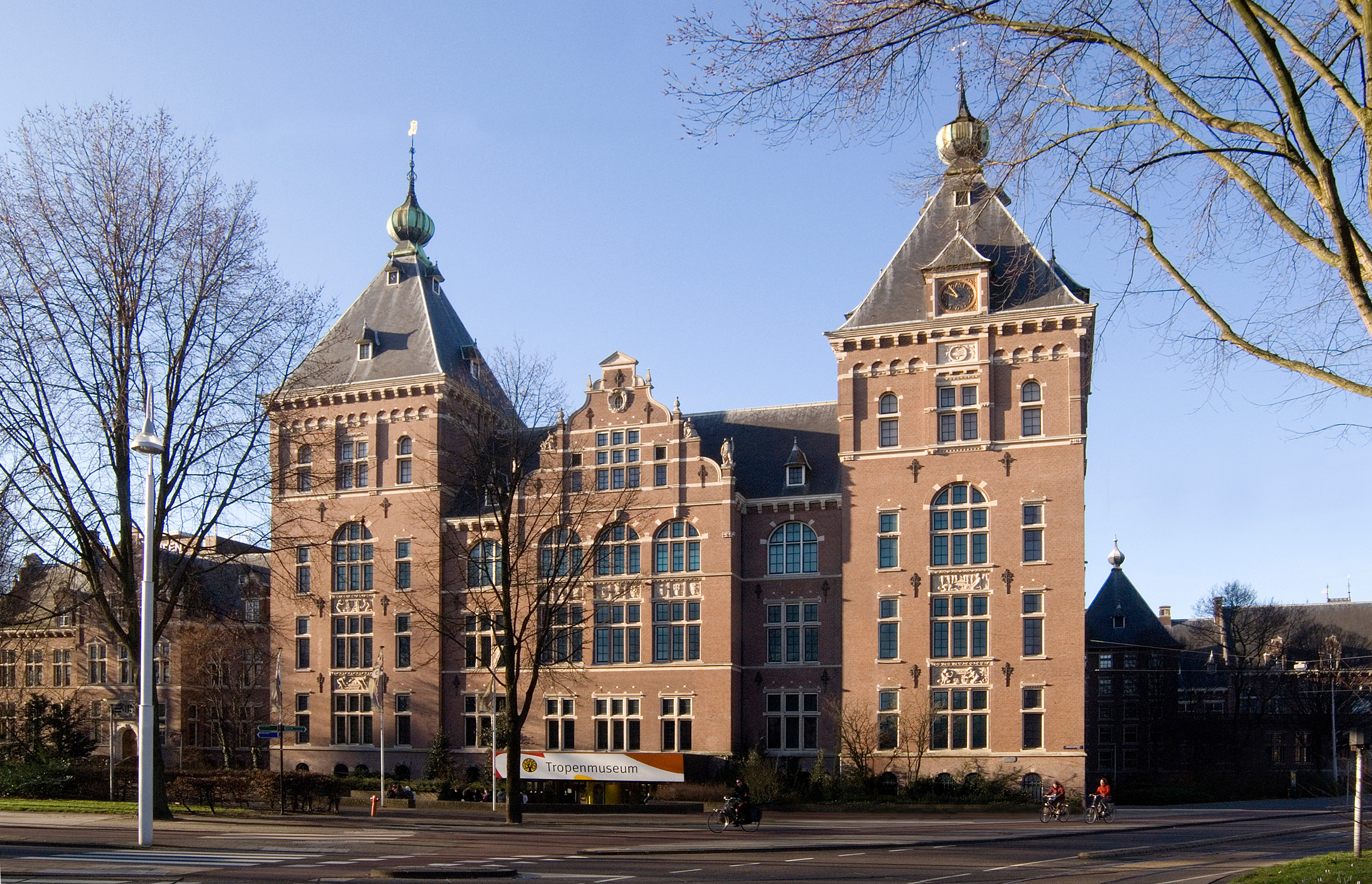
Tropenmuseum, Amsterdam, the Netherlands

The Dutch: Nationaal Museum van Wereldculturen (NMVW) (transl. National Museum of World Cultures) is an overarching museum organisation for the management of several ethnographic museums in the Netherlands, founded in 2014. It consists of the Tropenmuseum (transl. Tropical Museum) in Amsterdam, the Afrika Museum in Berg en Dal, and the Museum Volkenkunde (transl. Ethnology Museum) in Leiden. The National Museum of World Cultures works in close cooperation with the Wereldmuseum (transl. World Museum) in Rotterdam. It is also part of nation-wide Dutch organisations for research into provenance studies and projects of restitution of cultural heritage to countries of origin, like the former Dutch colony in today's Indonesia.

== Structure and collections ==
The Dutch National Museum of World Cultures (NMVW) was founded in 2014 by a merger of the Tropenmuseum in Amsterdam, the Museum Volkenkunde in Leiden and the Afrika Museum in Berg en Dal. It also oversees the Wereldmuseum in Rotterdam, whose collection belongs to that city. According to the museum's webpage, these collections contain "nearly 450,000 objects and 260,000 photographic images that are part of national or municipal collections, and another 350.000 images of documentary value."

The NMVW was created in the context of public discussions in the Netherlands, as well as in other European countries, about the colonial history of ethnographic collections and calls for the restitution of African cultural heritage to different countries of origin. About forty per cent of the collection in the museum is estimated to have been acquired in colonial contexts. As Stijn Schoonderwoerd, then director of the NMVW, said about this discussion: “It led us to question our colonial history, and we saw that we had the potential to ask a lot of questions about identity, control, power, inequality and decolonization.”

According to an article about the NMVW, published in the UNESCO Courier of October/December 2020, the museum began work on its guidance for repatriation in 2017. Already before this, repatriations are said to have "occurred over the decades, but claims had previously been handled on an ad hoc basis." In March 2019, a document called Return of Cultural Objects: Principles and Process was published, to express “the overall mission of the museum to address the long, complex and entangled histories that have resulted in the collections the museum holds.” It includes a “commitment to transparently address and evaluate claims for the return of cultural objects according to standards of respect, cooperation and timeliness.”

In a collaboration with the Rijksmuseum in Amsterdam and the Expertise Centre for the Restitution of Cultural Goods and the Second World War at the National Institute for War, Holocaust and Genocide Studies (NIOD), the NMVW is focused on Indonesia – with projects to consolidate research into colonial-era military expeditions and trading-house networks.

== Repatriation of cultural heritage ==
In March 2020, the Dutch culture minister returned a gold-inlaid kris – a large dagger – to the Indonesian ambassador in The Hague, on the basis of provenance research conducted by the museum. It belonged to Prince Diponegoro, a Javanese rebel leader and Indonesian hero who waged a five-year war against Dutch colonial rule from 1825 to 1830. Some of his belongings, including a saddle and a spear, were repatriated to Indonesia in the 1970s.

In January 2021, the Dutch government approved a central mechanism for the repatriation of colonial heritage. Upon the recommendations of an advisory commission, it announced to return any objects in the national collections found to have been illegally taken from former Dutch colonies. To this end, a research group of nine museums and Amsterdam’s Vrije Universiteit are said to launch a €4.5m project in June 2021 in order to develop practical guidance for Dutch museums on colonial collections.

"We will examine the diverse routes that objects took to enter museums—were they sold under duress or looted in times of war, traded or exchanged or given as gifts, and if so, was this in a colonial context? - We will also look at how to jointly decide on the future of an object and whether there are various modes of return that are possible. And, finally, this is about reconciliation—how do modes of return or restitution help us to reconcile with the past?”

— Wayne Modest, National Museum of World Cultures, The Netherlands

== See also ==
- Dutch Empire
- Report on the restitution of African cultural heritage

== Sources ==
This article incorporates text from a free content work. Licensed under CC BY-SA 3.0 IGO (license statement/permission). Text taken from The Netherlands: Museums confront the country’s colonial past, Hickley, Catherine, UNESCO. UNESCO Courier, no 3, 2020.
