= Colonial Institute =

Colonial Institute may refer to:

- The Colonial Institute, Brussels, Belgium
- The Royal Colonial Institute in London, England, now known as the Royal Commonwealth Society
- The Royal Tropical Institute in Amsterdam, the Netherlands, originally called the Colonial Institute
- The University of Hamburg, formerly the Colonial Institute (Kolonialinstitut)
