= Africa Museum =

- Afrika Museum
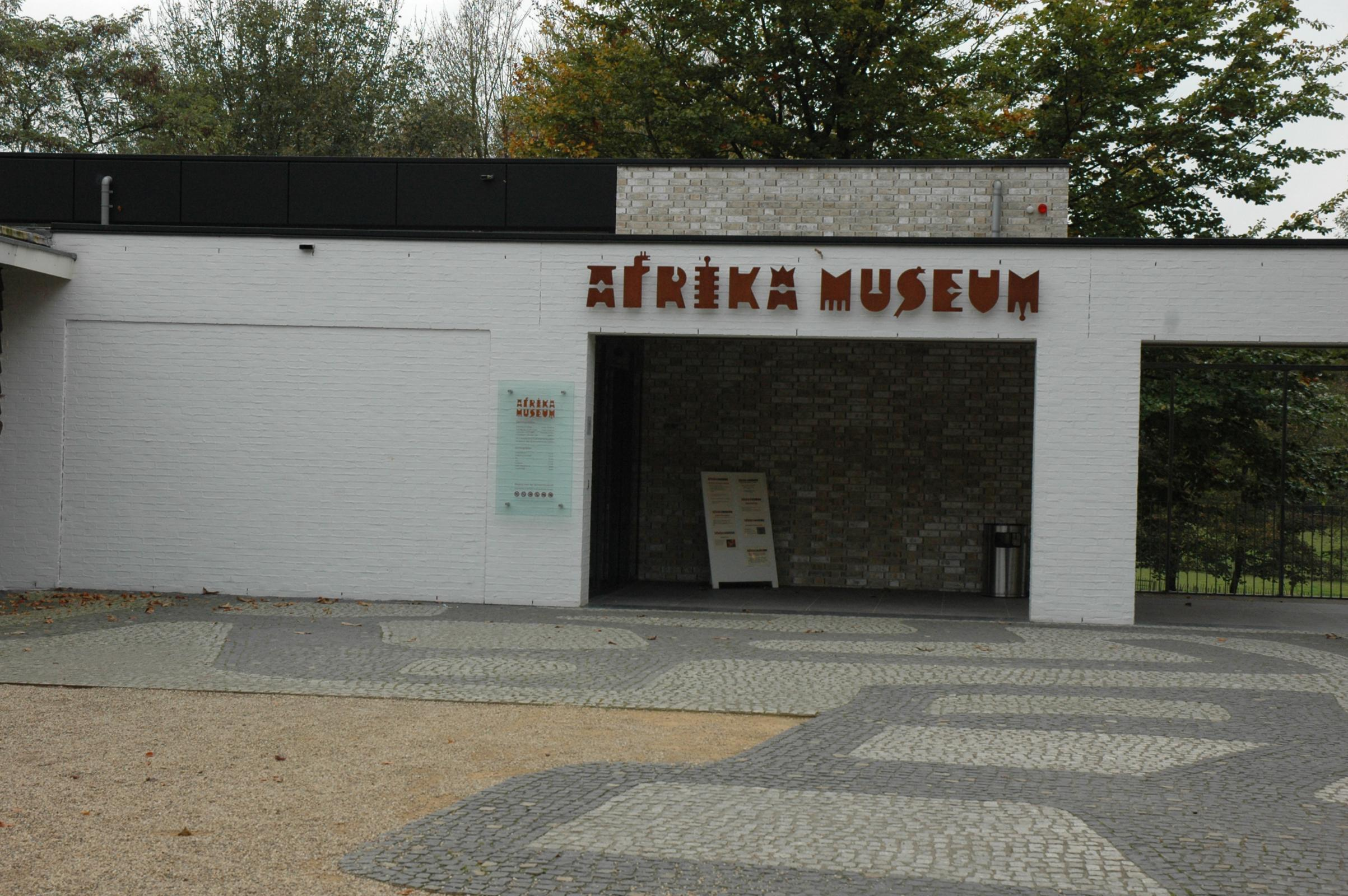
- Museum entrance in 2007

- Location within Gelderland
- Location: Postweg 6 Berg en Dal, Netherlands
- Coordinates: 51°48′45″N 5°54′34″E
- Type: Anthropological museum
- Directors: Wayne Modest & Marieke van Bommel
- Website: afrikamuseum.nl

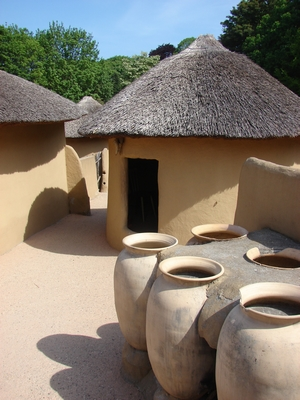
Outdoor display of African architecture

The Africa Museum (Dutch: Afrika Museum) was a museum in Berg en Dal in the Netherlands. The museum on the outskirts of the city of Nijmegen was a complex with indoor as well as open-air display areas, covering art, culture, music, photographs, videos and architecture of Africa. As of 2014, the museum, along with the Tropenmuseum in Amsterdam, and National Museum of Ethnology (Museum Volkenkunde) in Leiden, together make up the National Museum of World Cultures. It has been closed since November 2023.

== Collection ==
Apart from displaying traditional historic sculptures, the museum focused on exhibiting contemporary art produced in Africa and the diaspora such as North and South America and the Caribbean, especially on the islands of Cuba, Haiti and Curaçao. The section on religion and society displayed artefacts regarding the cycle of life, healing, fighting off the evil. Outside, the visitors can experience rebuilt African architecture such as a Kusasi compound from Ghana, a Dogon clay building village from Mali and river-side pile dwellings from Benin.

== History ==
The museum was founded in 1954 as a missionary museum, five years after the Fathers of the Holy Spirit had acquired a property, which was to become a place of rest for the members of their congregation. With the museum they wanted to pay homage to the African cultures they had encountered and increase awareness of these cultures in Europe. While being stationed in Africa they had occasionally obtained objects for colonial exhibitions and collected objects that were both evidence of religious practices and of daily life and were sometimes destined for sale in the museum's store.

Father J.B. Van Croonenburg wanted to attract a broader public to understand the beauty and richness of African culture. Father Jan Vissers objected in the Cabinda area against the destruction of the traditional objects of the Woyo and collected a group of pottery lids with figural sculptures.

In 1987 the museum opened its outdoor exhibition, which consisted of several reconstituted African villages.

== Indoor exhibition ==
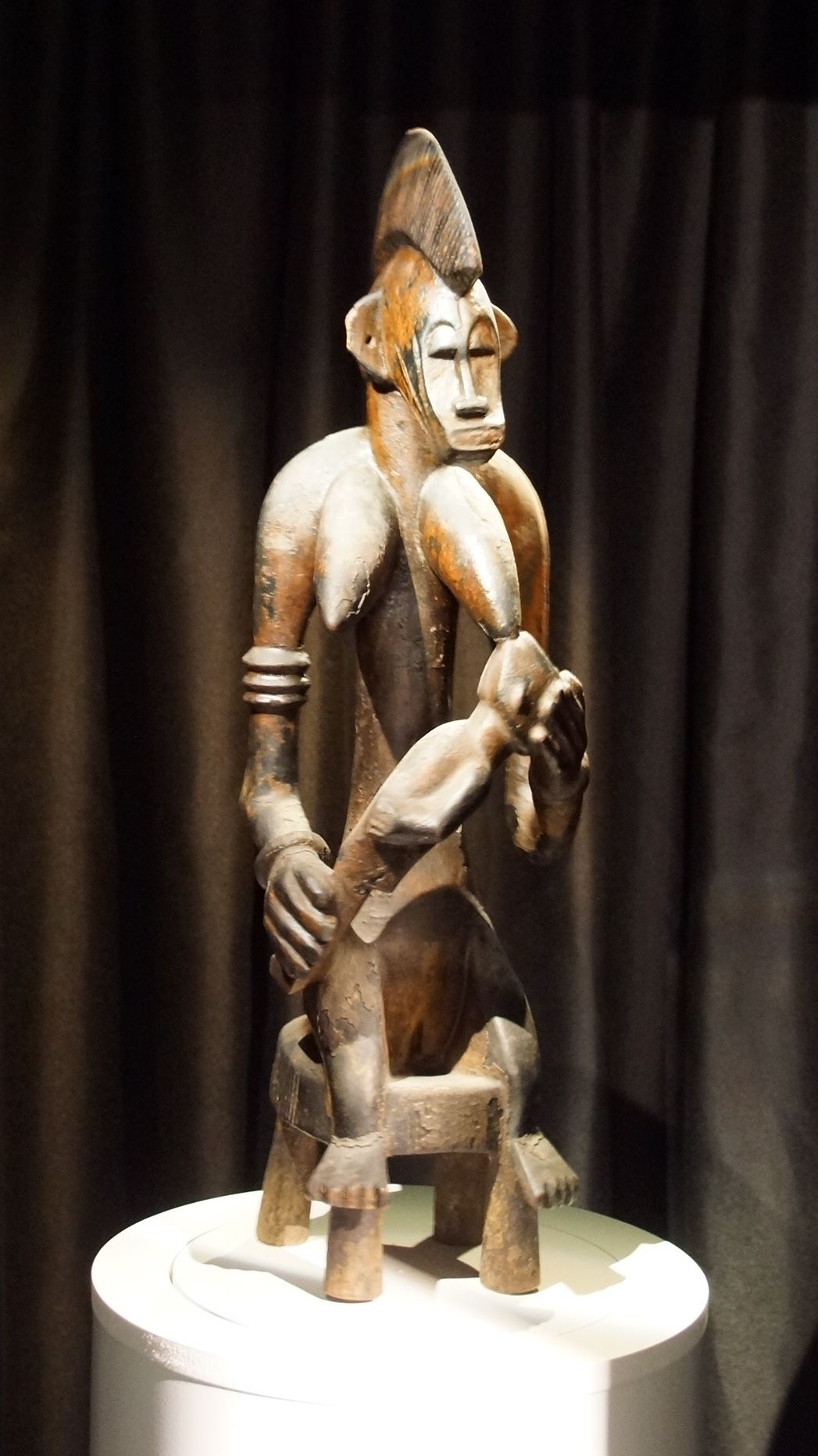
Senufo sculpture, Ivory Coast

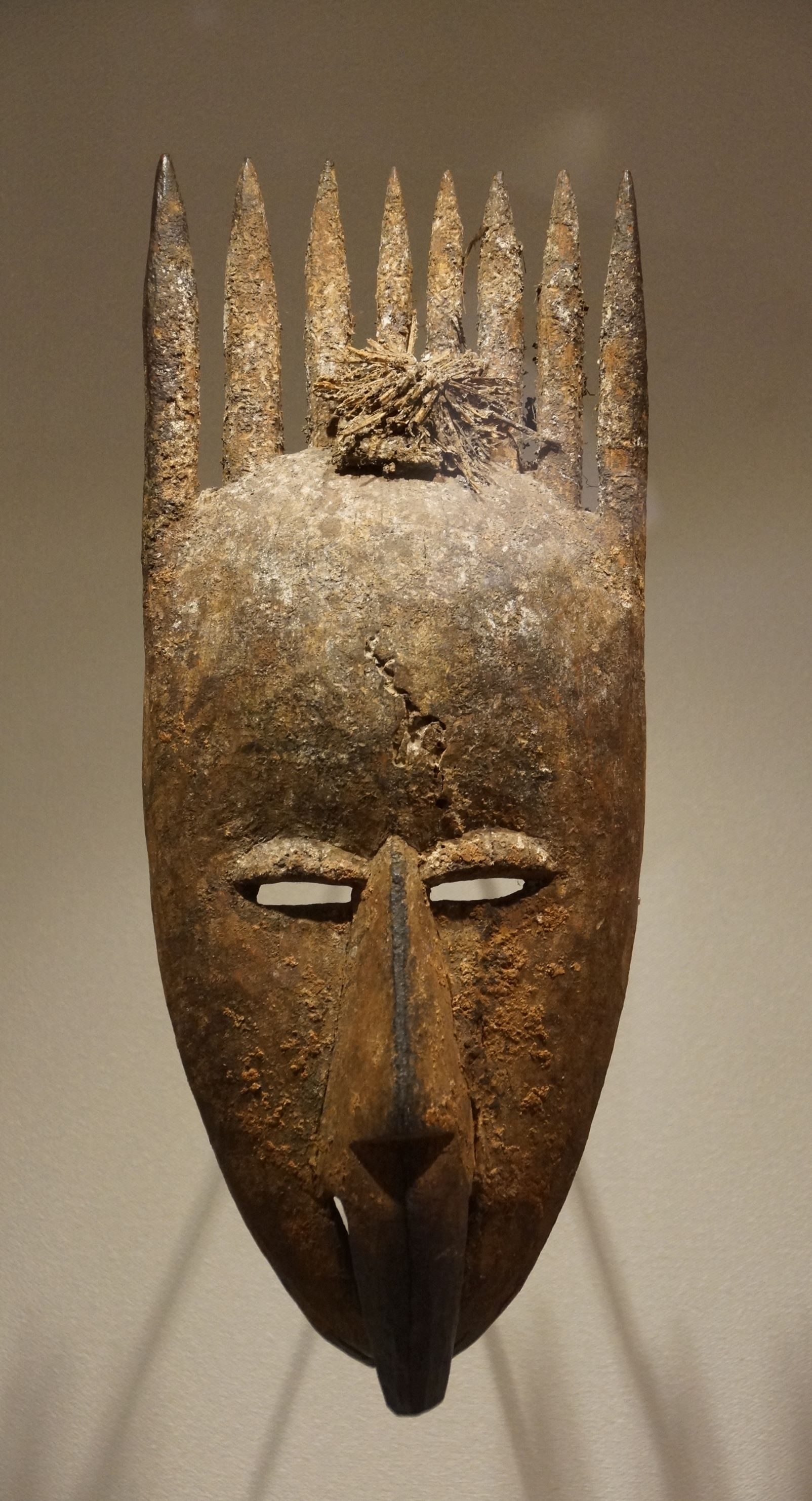
Mau mask, Ivory Coast

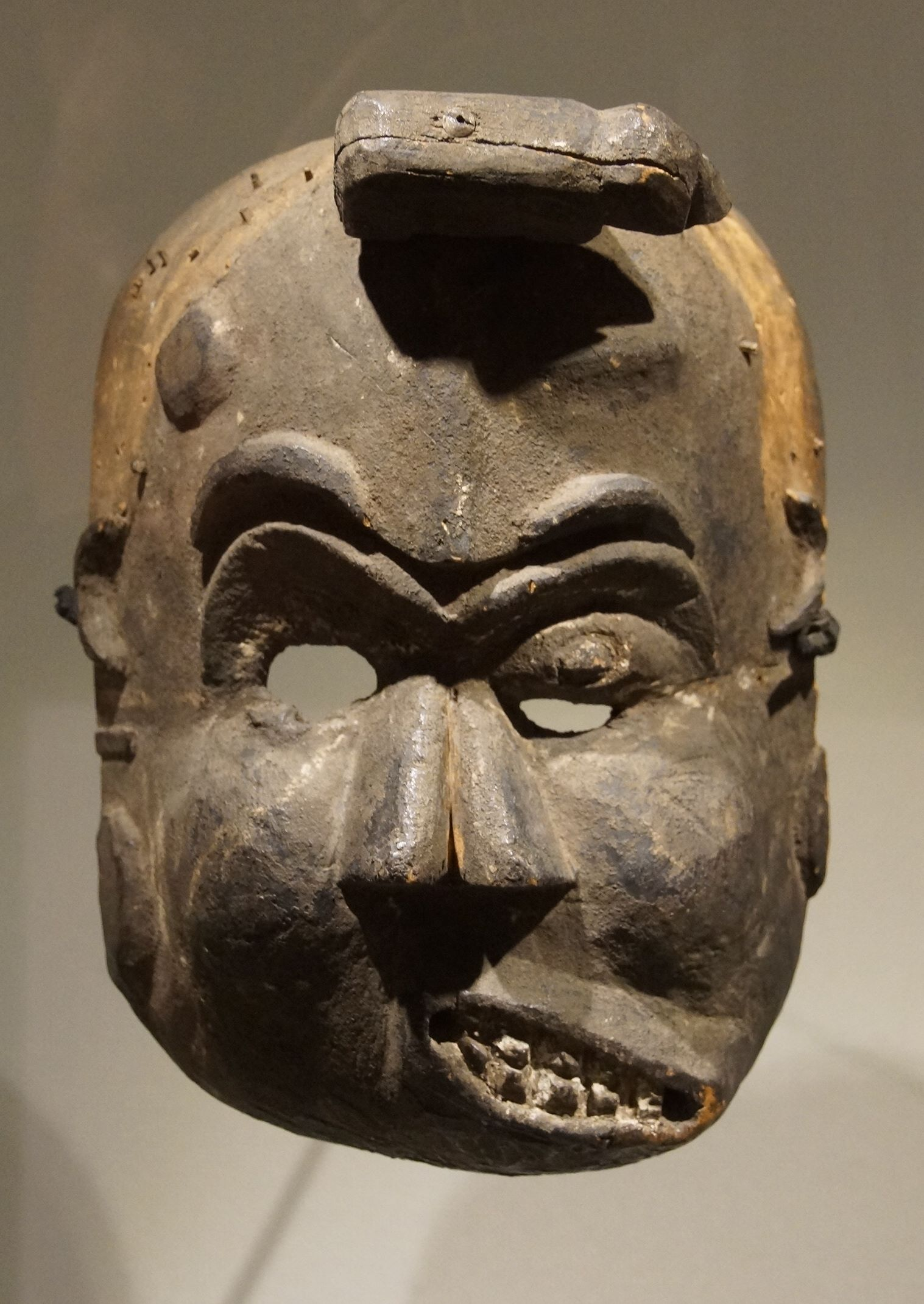
Ekpo mask

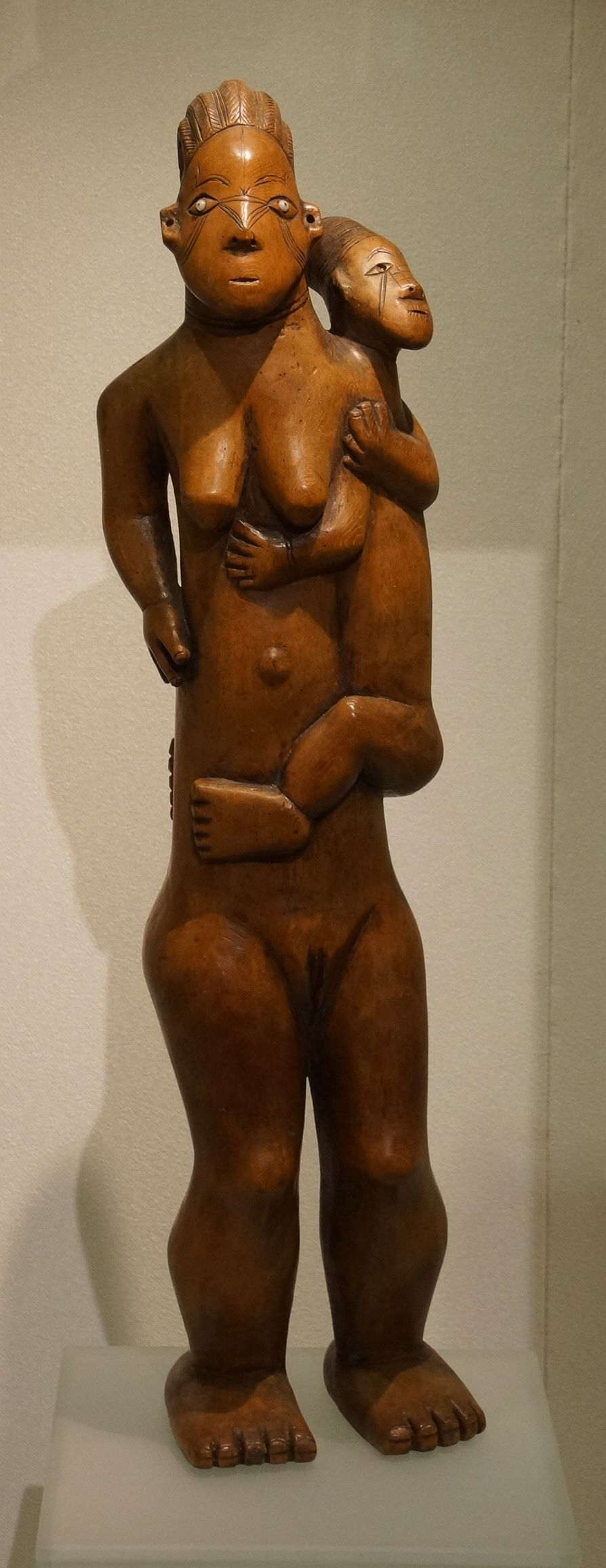
Magbetu, Congo

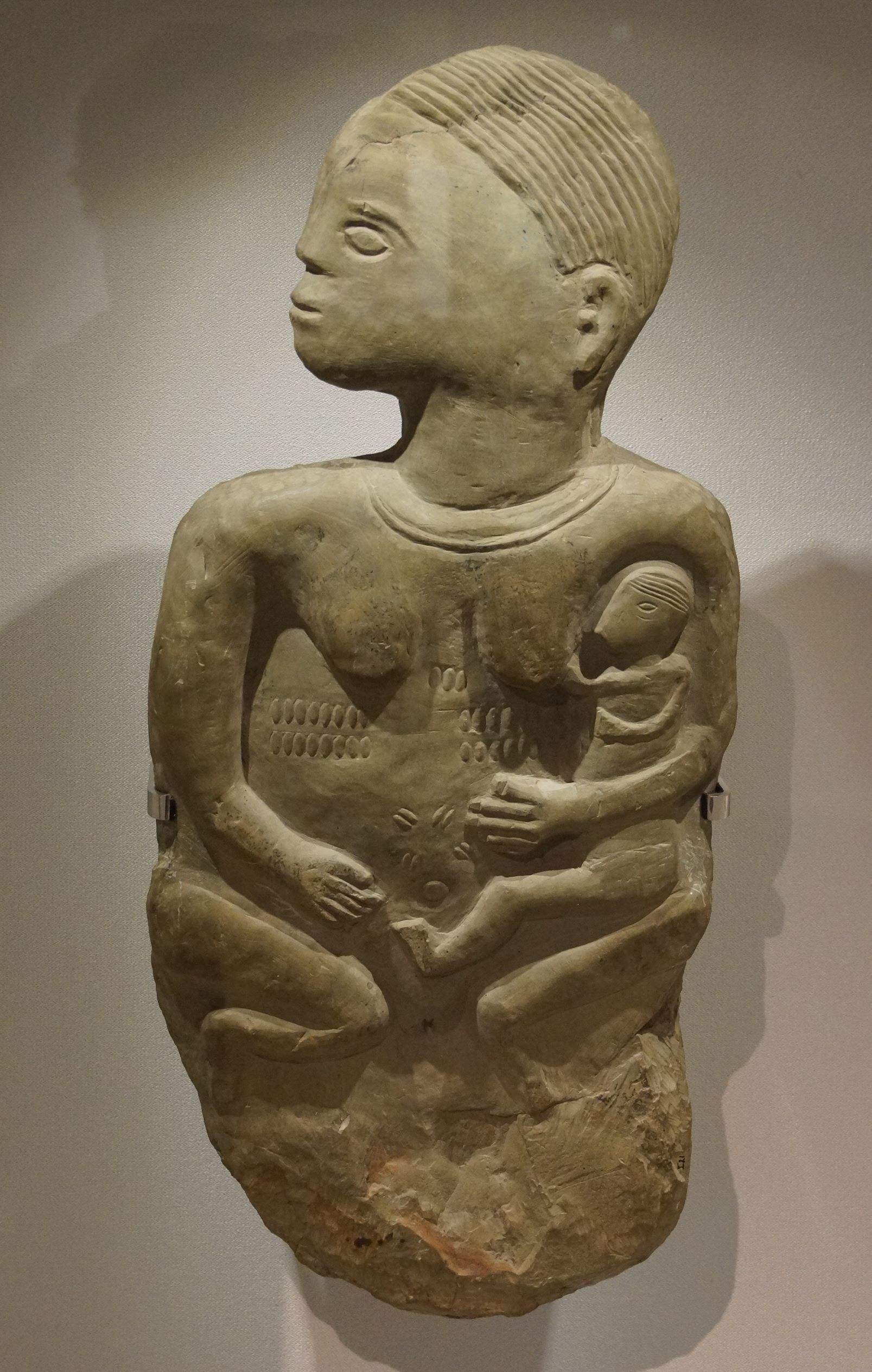
Mbamba grave stone, Angola

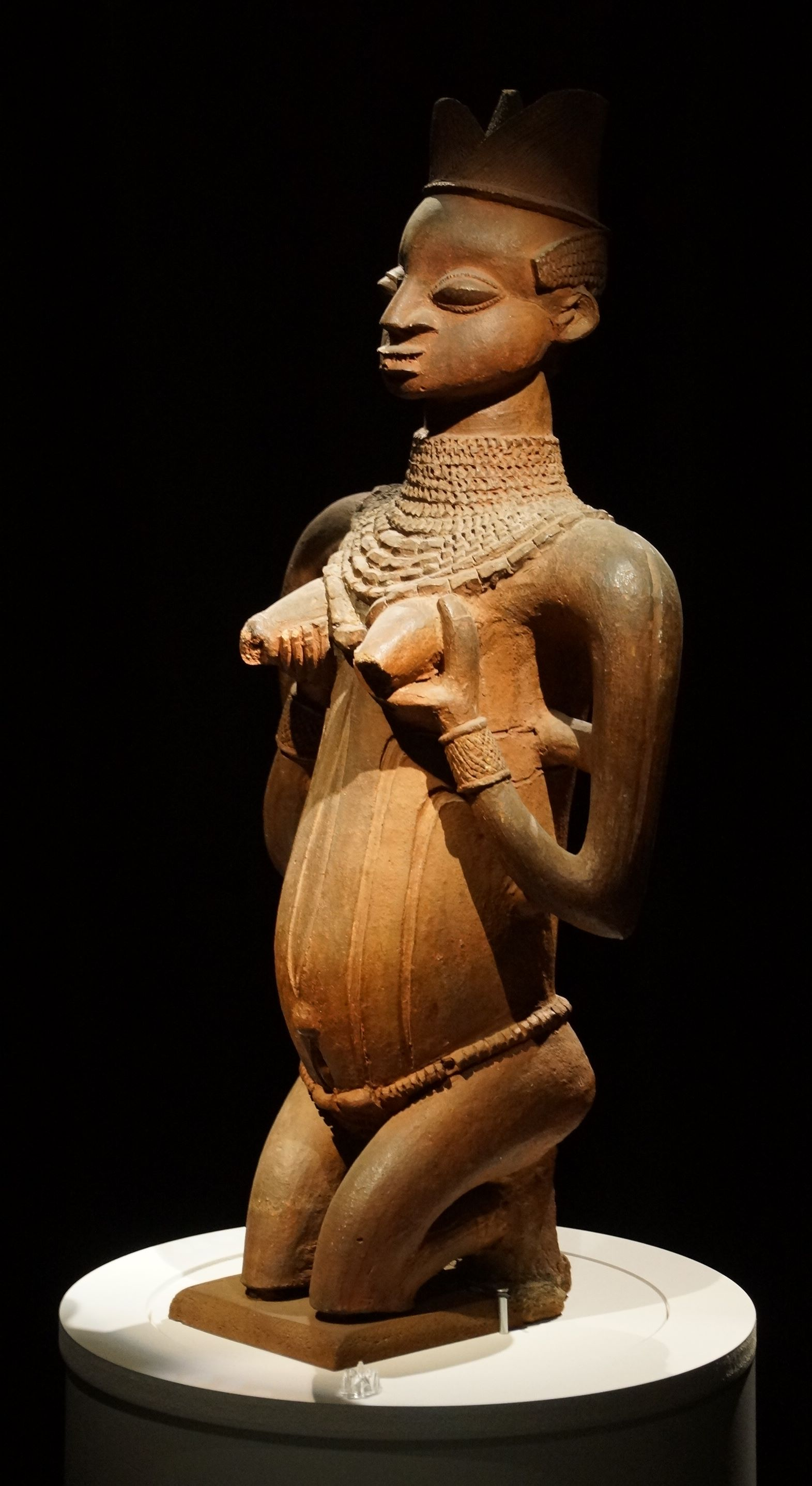
Wooden sculpture

== Outdoor exhibition ==
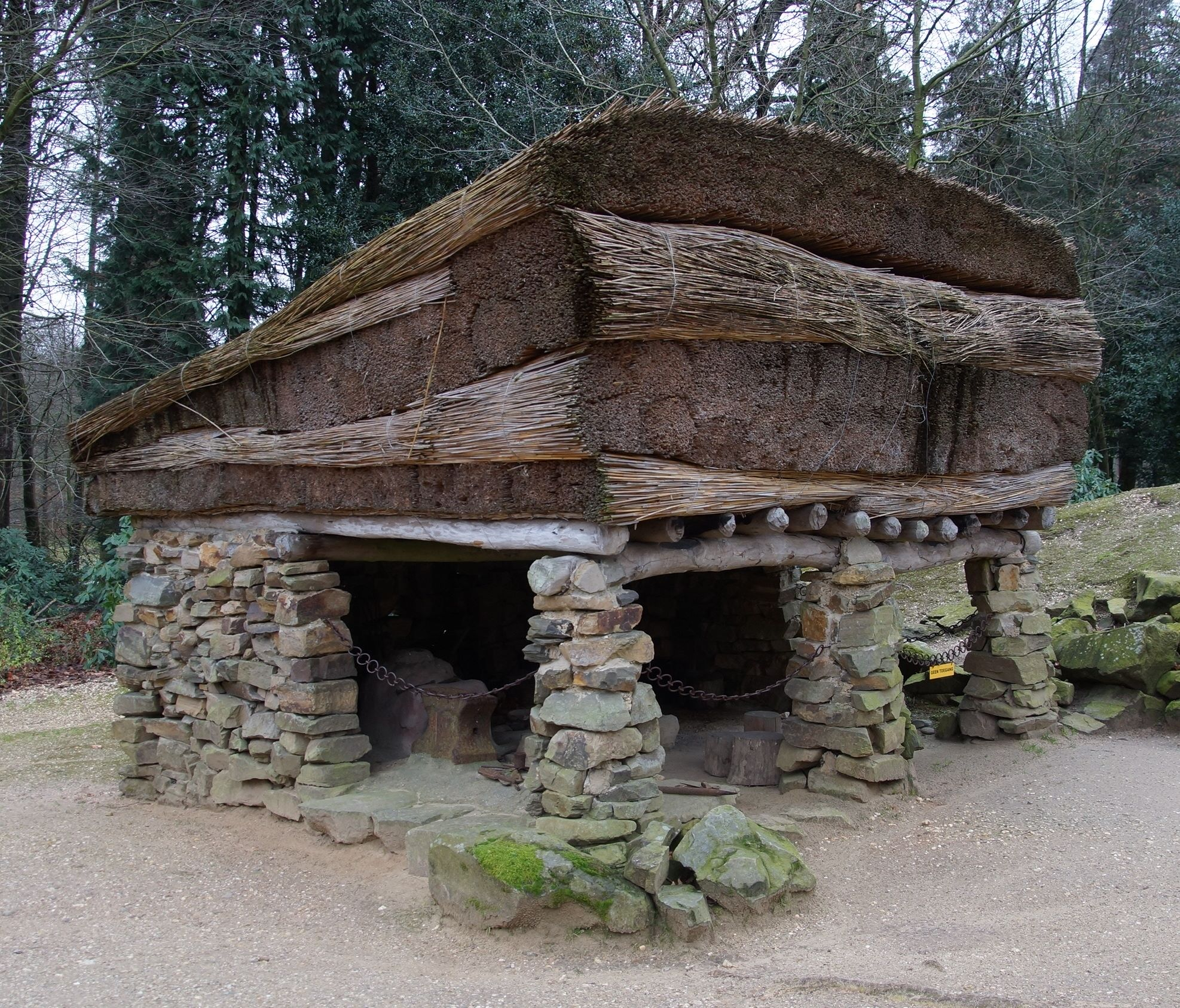
Dogon house

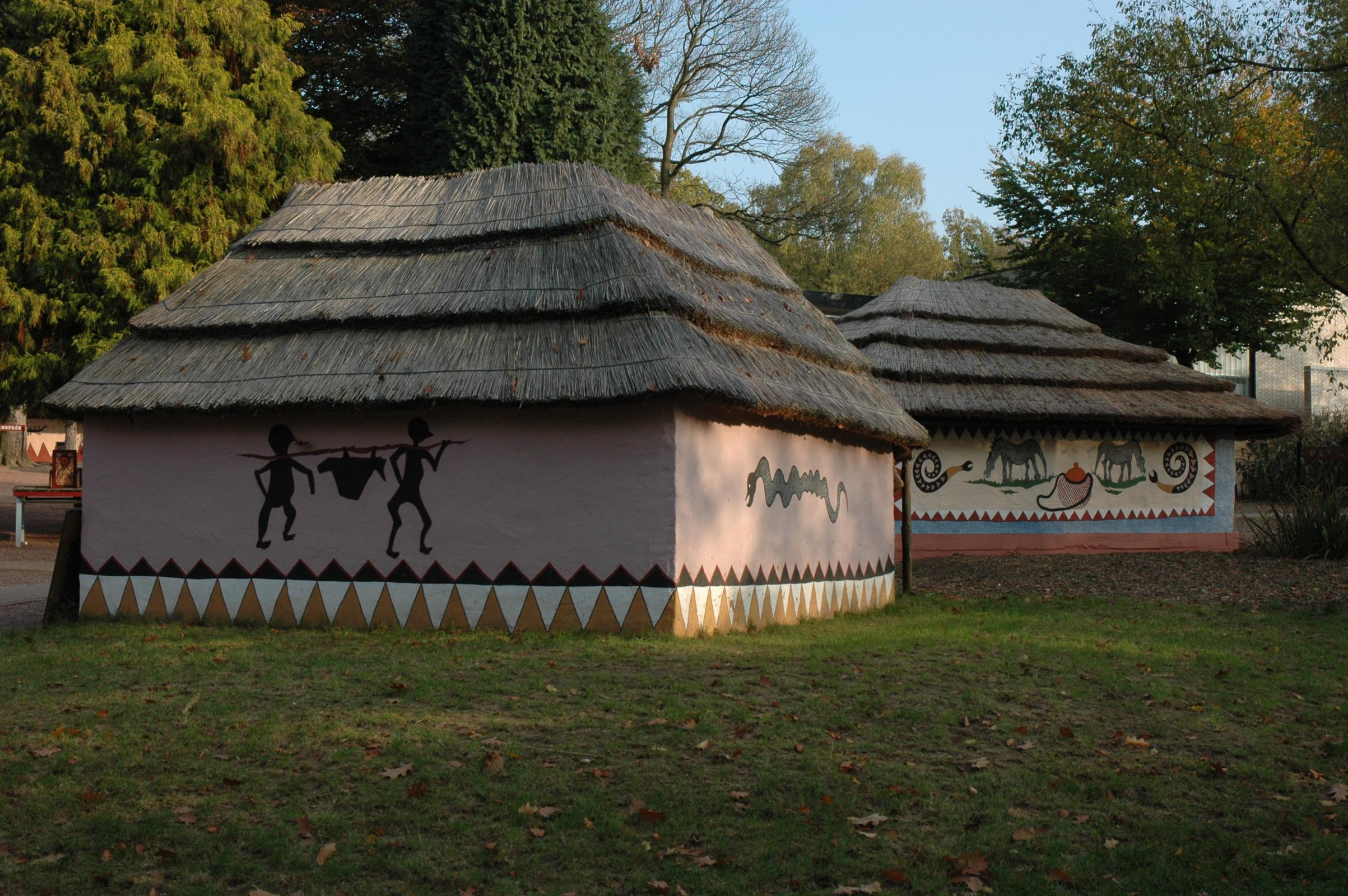
Houses with murals

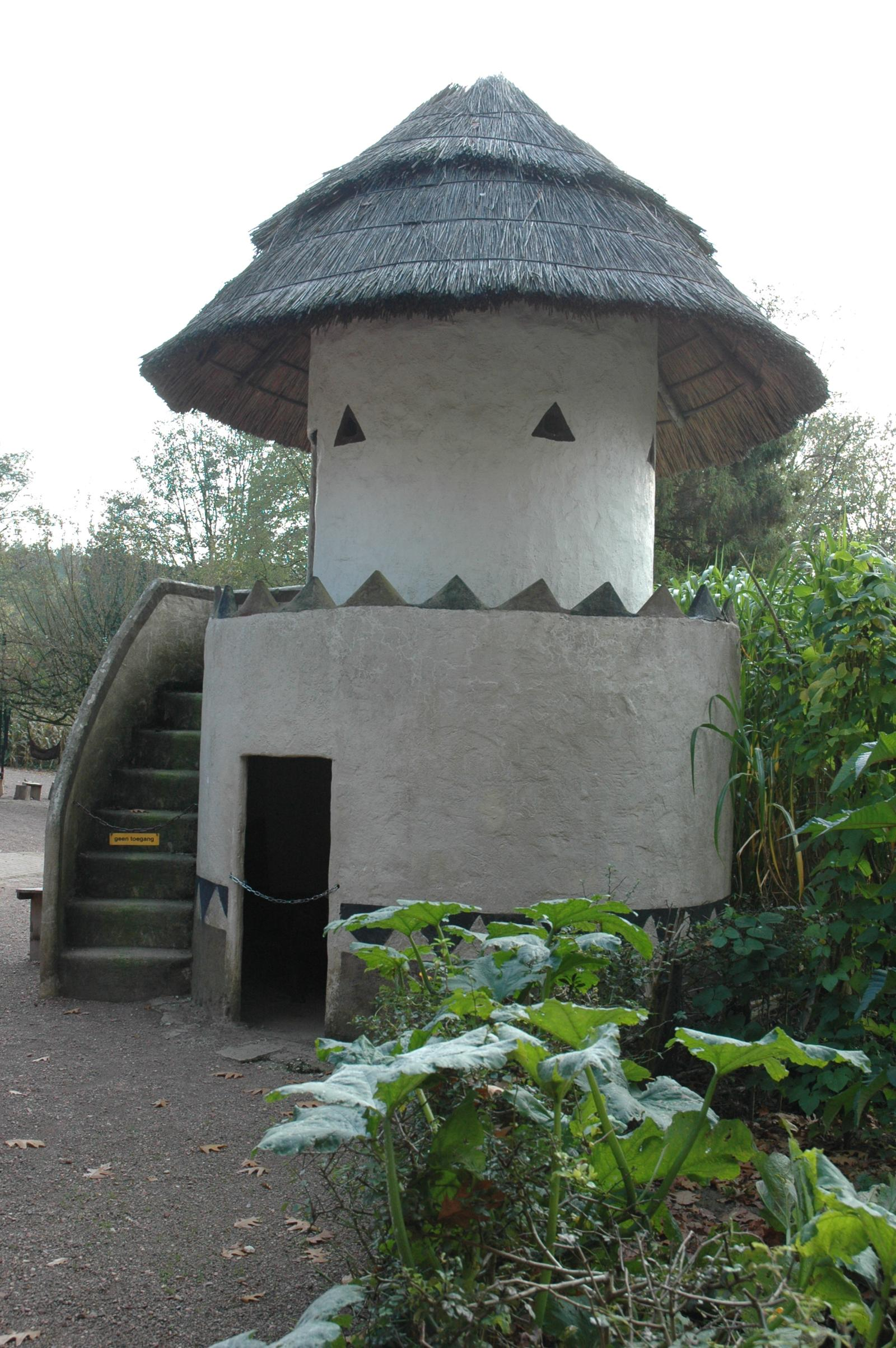
Tower

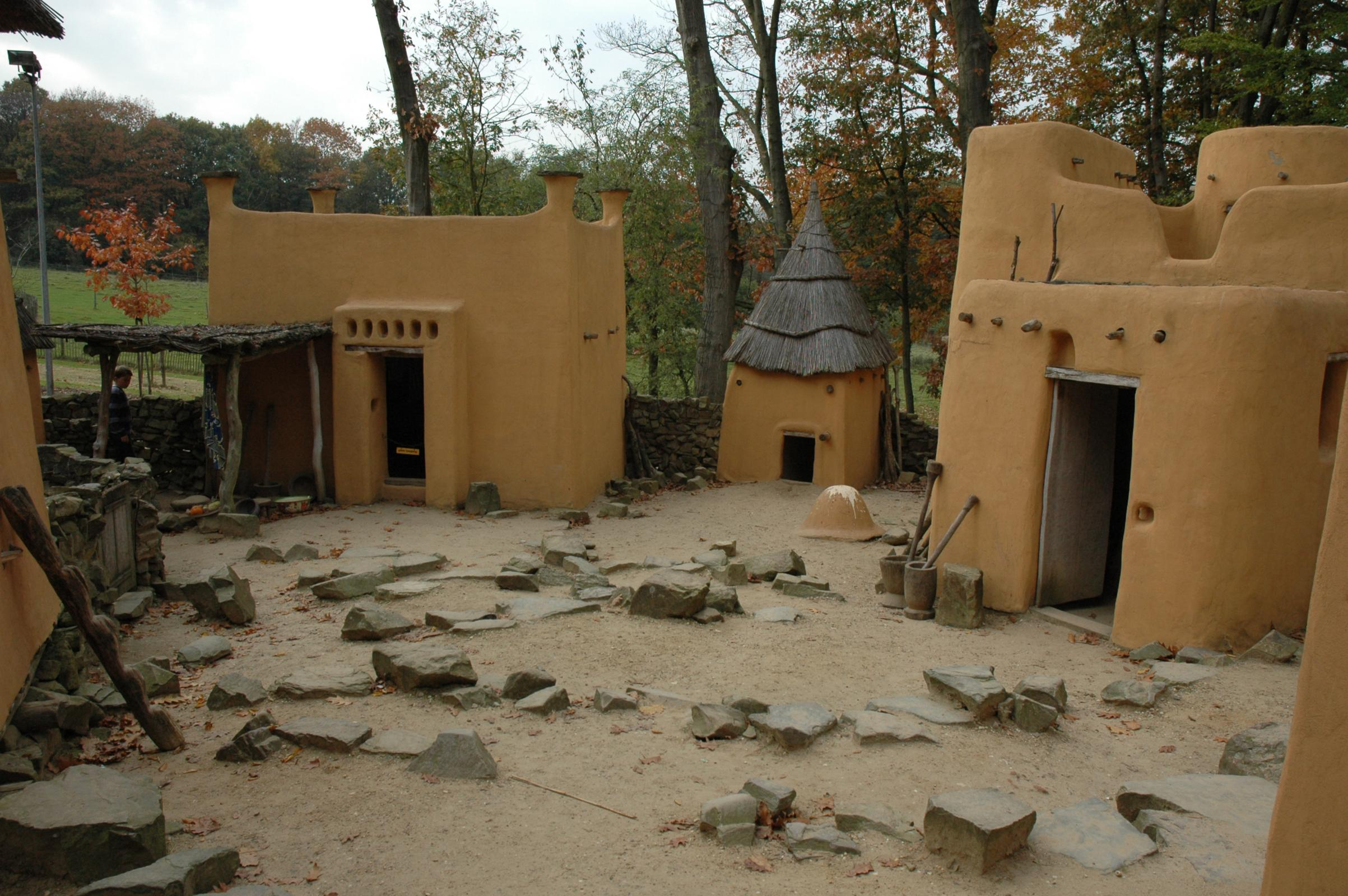
African village

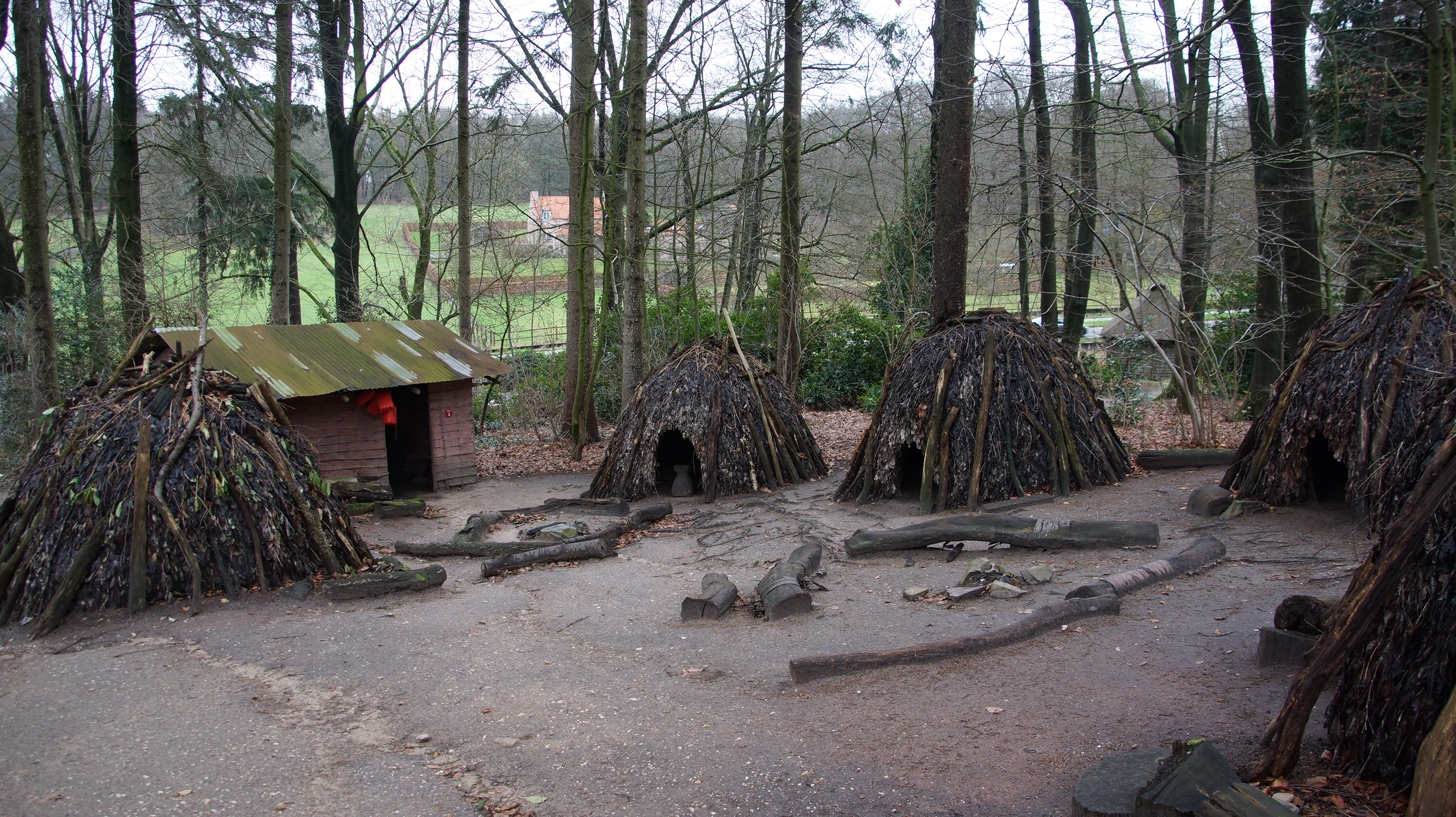
Baka Pygmies village

== See also ==
- Nationaal Museum van Wereldculturen
