= Frederik Willem van Eeden (botanist) =

Dutch botanist (1829–1901)

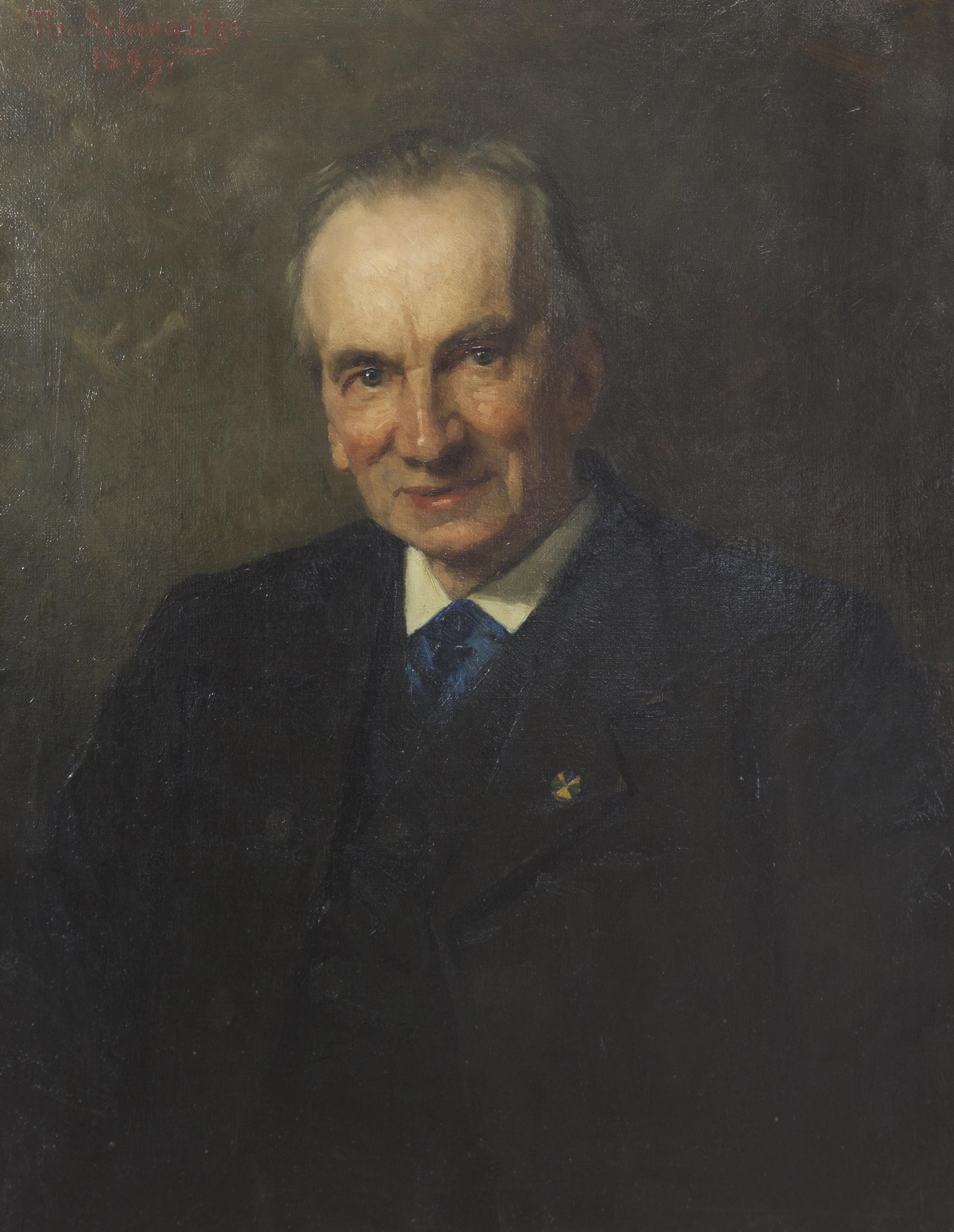
- F.W. van Eeden (by Thérèse Schwartze (1899))
- Born: 26 August 1829; Haarlem
- Died: 4 May 1901 4 May 1901 (aged 71); Indonesia
- Known for: Natural Monument and Royal Tropical Institute
- Children: Frederik van Eeden
- Scientific career
- Fields: Botany

Frederik Willem van Eeden (26 October 1829, in Haarlem – 4 May 1901, in Haarlem) was a Dutch amateur botanist. He was the father of the writer Frederik van Eeden.

He was born in Haarlem, where he became general secretary-treasurer of the Dutch Society for the Promotion of Industry and director of the Museum of Applied Arts. From 1871, until his death he was director of the Colonial Museum (the predecessor of the Colonial Institute, later the Royal Tropical Institute in Amsterdam), which was founded on his initiative in 1864.

F. W. van Eeden was probably the first to use the concept (not the word) natural monument (in his book Onkruid). In this book, he suggested the idea of preserving some parts of the Netherlands as a monument to nature.

== Works ==
- De Duinen en Bosschen van Kennemerland (Groningen, 1866)
- Hortus Batavus (Amsterdam, 1868)
- De Botanie van het dagelijksch leven (Purmerend, 1870)
- De Koloniën op de internationale tentoonstelling te Amsterdam in 1883 (Haarlem, 1884)
- Onkruid. Botanische Wandelingen (2 delen, Haarlem, 1886)
- Noorderlicht. Bezoek aan Scandinavië in 1887 (Haarlem, 1888).

In 1877, Van Eeden completed the 15th and final volume of the standard work Flora Batava, which was started in 1800. In addition, he made many contributions to the Nederlandsch Kruidkundig Archief (Dutch Herbal Archive), the Album der Natuur (Album of Nature), and the Tijdschrift der Nederlandsche Maatschappij (Journal of the Dutch Society of Industry). The standard author abbreviation Eeden is used to indicate this person as the author when citing a botanical name.

== Literature ==
- Duuren, David van: 125 jaar verzamelen: Tropenmuseum Amsterdam. KIT, Amsterdam, 1990.
