= Cornelis Bonne =

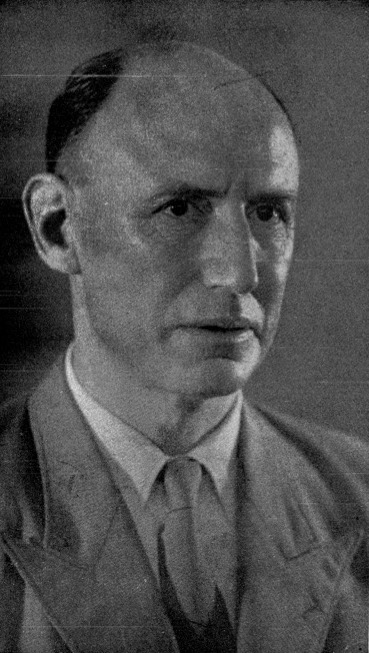

Cornelis Bonne (3 October 1890 – 25 April 1948) was a Dutch physician, pathologist and malariologist who worked in Dutch colonies in Surinam and Java. He studied mosquitoes along with his wife Johanna Bonne-Wepster and they also studied the diseases spread by them.

Bonne was born in Ilpendam and studied in Amsterdam where he received a medical degree in 1913. He became interested in tropical medicine and attended a course by Rudolph Hendrik Saltet (1853–1927) and Nicolaas Swellengrebel. He also received a diploma from the London School of Tropical Medicine in 1914. In 1915 he worked as a health officer in the Netherlands before moving to Surinam. He married physician Johanna Wepster (d. 1978) in 1915. The couple lived in Suriname until 1919 during which time they collected mosquitoes extensively. They also visited Panama and North America. In 1920 he joined the Suriname Bauxite Company as a doctor and during this period he and his wife wrote a book on the mosquitoes of Surinam. He suggested during this period that an exposure to dengue might reduce the severity of yellow-fever. In 1923 he went to work at the Pasteur Institute in Paris and from 1924 to 1927 he worked at the Netherlands Cancer Institute in Amsterdam. In 1927 he moved to Batavia as a professor of pathology at the newly established medical college. He also began to edit the Medical Journal of the Dutch East Indies ("Geneeskundig Tijdschrift voor Nederlandisch Indië"). The Bonne-Wepster mosquito collection contained about 55000 specimens. He was appointed Knight of the Order of the Netherlands Lion and was a member of many scientific institutions.
