= Johanna Bonne-Wepster =

Dutch entomologist

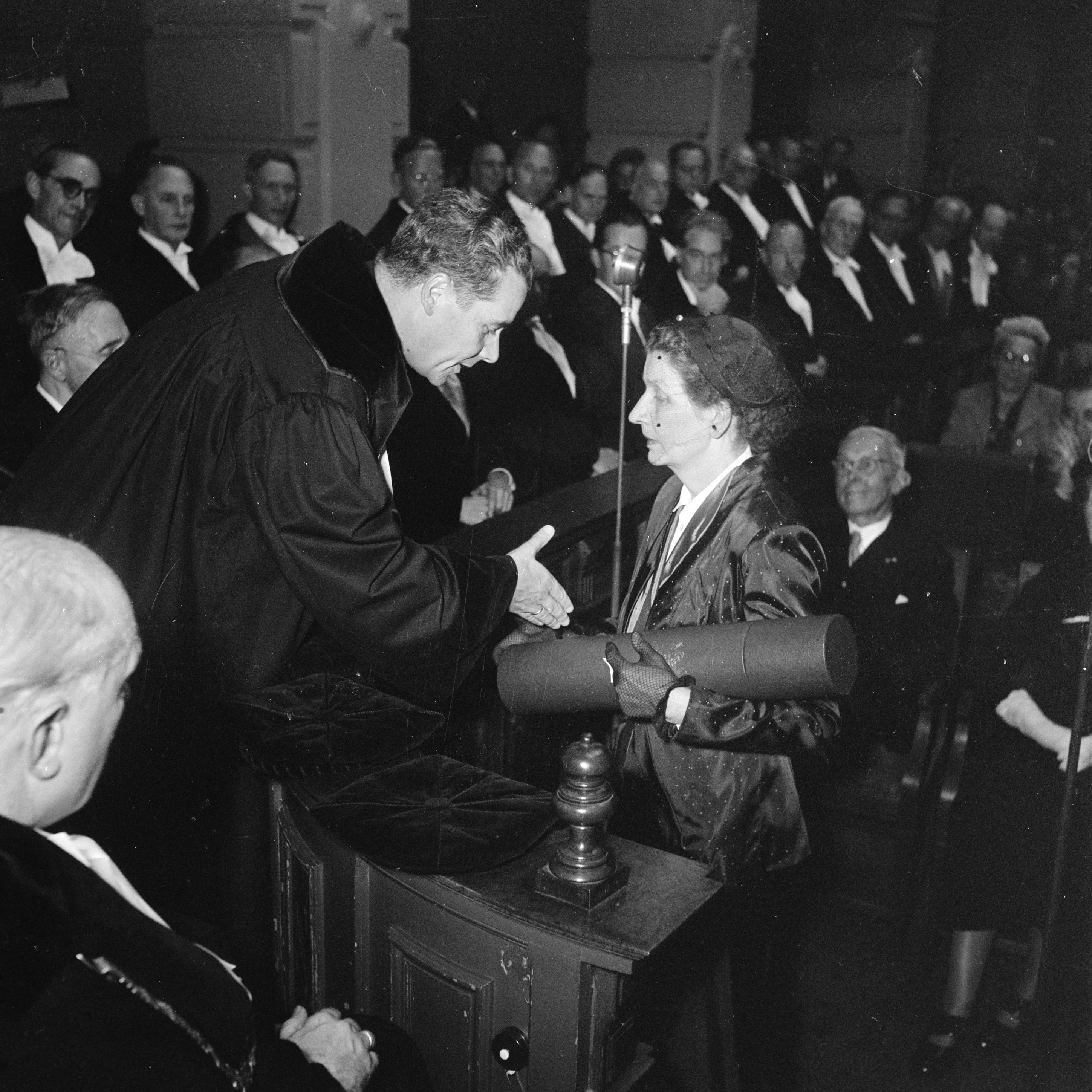
Johanna Bonne-Wepster receiving her honorary Doctorate at the University of Amsterdam

Johanna Bonne-Wepster (The Hague, June 13, 1892 – Amstelveen, May 4, 1978) was a Dutch entomologist who researched disease-transmitting mosquitoes and collected and identified a large collection of mosquitoes over her long career.

== Life ==
Johanna Wepster was born on June 13, 1892, in The Hague, and trained as a teacher.

Johanna Wepster married Cornelis Bonne (1890–1948), pathologist and parasitologist with an interest in tropical medicine, in 1915. Bonne graduated as a doctor in Amsterdam in 1913 and then trained in London at the 'London School of Tropical Medicine. In 1915 he left for Suriname as a doctor in the service of The Royal Netherlands East Indies Army, where from 1920 he was employed by the Surinamese Bauxite Company. In 1927 the couple left for the Dutch East Indies, where Bonne taught at the Geneeskundige Hogeschool te Batavia (now the Faculty of Medicine, University of Indonesia).

Bonne-Wepster initially acquired her knowledge of mosquitoes and their role in the spread of disease through Cornelis Bonne. The couple started their research in Suriname, where they intensively collected mosquitoes from 1916 to 1925. The couple lived in the Dutch East Indies from 1927 to 1948, where they continued their research and collected tens of thousands of mosquito specimens and named several new species. After her internment as a Japanese prisoner of war, she was temporarily in charge of the Malaria Control Service in Indonesia. Cornelis Bonne was also briefly president of the University of Indonesia before the couple returned to the Netherlands.

In 1948 Cornelis Bonne and Johanna Bonne-Wepster returned to the Netherlands, where Cornelis Bonne died on April 25, 1948, in Rotterdam. From 1949 until her retirement in 1963, Johanna Bonne-Wepster was a research assistant at the University of Amsterdam. She was also affiliated with the Royal Tropical Institute, at the 'Institute for Tropical Hygiene and Geographical Pathology'. Her field of research was medical entomology and in particular the taxonomy and systematics of mosquitoes. Her main interest in this was practical: to help doctors identify those species that could spread diseases.

Bonne-Wepster's collection of over 10,000 mosquitoes are currently housed at the Naturalis Biodiversity Center in Leiden. Her field-notes were nearly lost but these have now been brought back to life, through digitisation 52,102 of her records of mosquitoes have been linked to collected specimens and shared into the public domain via the Global Biodiversity Information Facility database.

== Recognition ==
Even though she no formal academic training her enormous contribution to the field of Culicidae taxonomy did not go unnoticed. She received, an honorary doctorate from the University of Amsterdam in 1951. Johanna Bonne-Wepster died on May 4, 1978, in Amstelveen.
