= Wereldmuseum Rotterdam =

Wereldmuseum
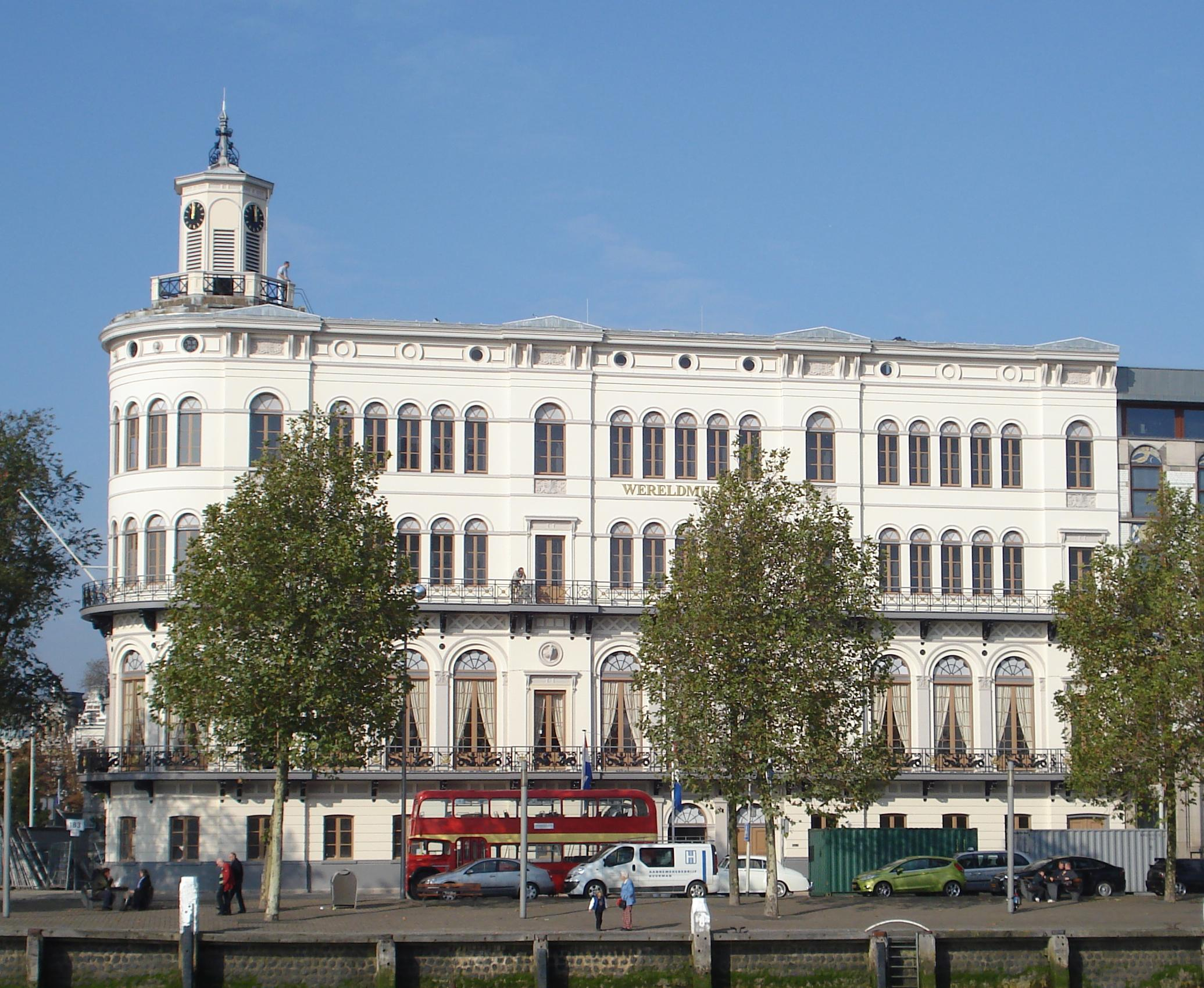
- Museum building in the center of Rotterdam

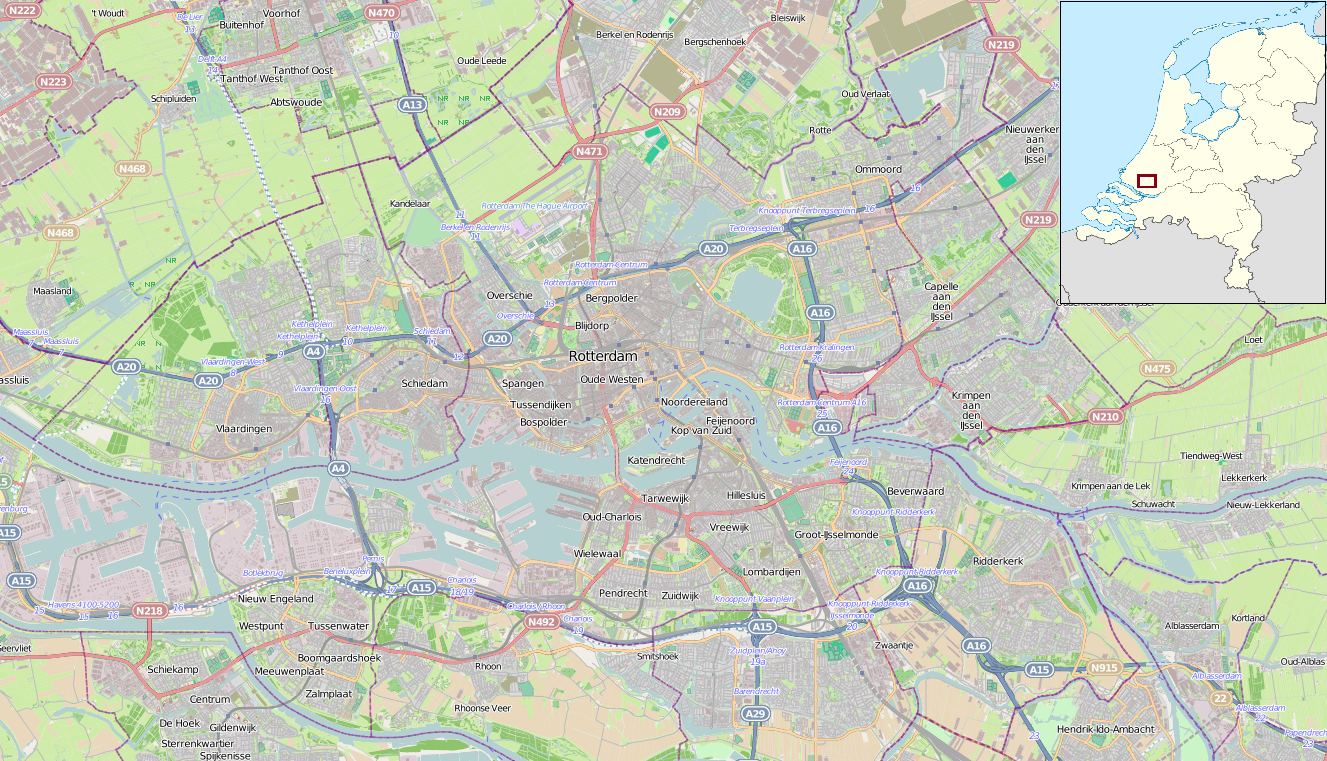
- Location within Rotterdam in the Netherlands
- Former name: Museum voor Land- en Volkenkunde
- Established: 1 May 1885
- Location: Willemskade 25; Rotterdam, Netherlands
- Coordinates: 51.9079°N 4.4804°E
- Type: Ethnographic museum
- Visitors: 130,000 (2010)
- Directors: Wayne Modest & Marieke van Bommel
- Website: www.wereldmuseum.nl

The Wereldmuseum Rotterdam (formerly known as the Museum voor Land- en Volkenkunde) is an ethnographic museum, situated at Willemskade in Rotterdam, the Netherlands.

The museum was founded in 1883 and shows more than 1800 ethnographic objects from various cultures in Asia, Oceania, Africa, the Americas and the Islamic heritage.

== See also ==
- Nationaal Museum van Wereldculturen
