= Royal Tropical Institute =

Dutch institute for sustainability

- Tropeninstituut
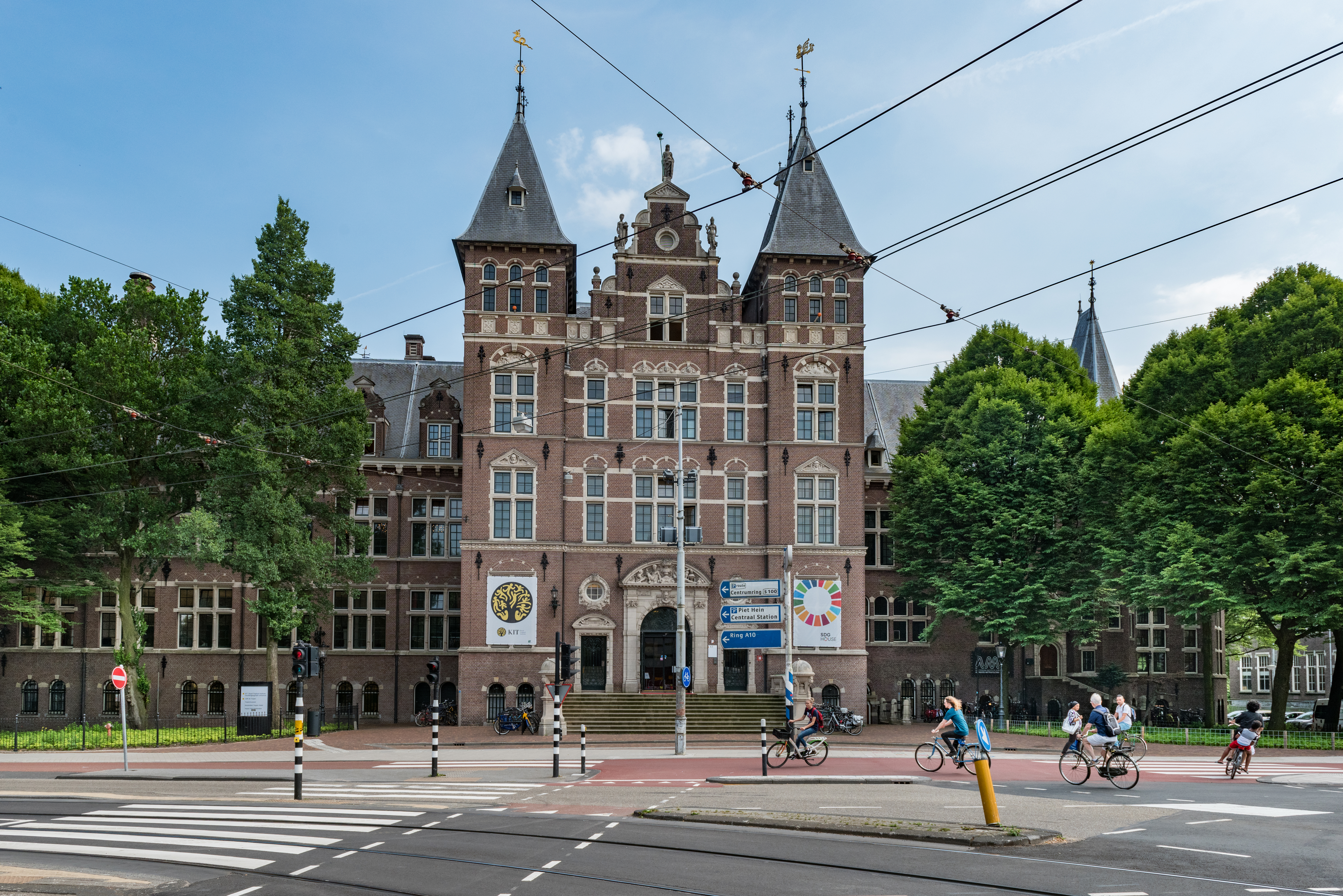
- Front view in 2019
- Established: 1864
- Location: Mauritskade 63, Amsterdam, The Netherlands
- Coordinates: 52.362692°N 4.922517°E
- Public transit access: Alexanderplein; GVB tram lines 1, 13, 14, 19
- Website: www.kit.nl

KIT, formerly the Royal Tropical Institute (Dutch: Koninklijk Instituut voor de Tropen), is an applied knowledge institute located in Amsterdam, Netherlands. It is an independent centre of expertise, education, intercultural cooperation and hospitality dedicated to sustainable development.

== About Royal Tropical Institute ==
KIT Royal Tropical Institute is an independent centre of expertise and education for sustainable development. KIT assists governments, NGOs and private corporations around the world to build inclusive and sustainable societies, informing best practices and measuring their impact. Guided by the Sustainable Development Goals (SDGs) of the United Nations, KIT's work focuses on health care, gender, economic development and intercultural cooperation.

KIT's campus in Amsterdam houses a training centre for students and professionals. It is also the home of SDG House: a community of sustainability experts and social entrepreneurs with a membership of 50+ organisations. KIT owns and operates Amsterdam Tropen Hotel, De Tropen café-restaurant, and offers office and conference facilities in its landmark building, the revenues of which contribute to KIT's mission.

== History ==
=== Early history ===
The institute's history dates to 1864, when the Colonial Museum was founded in Haarlem, to house the collection of artefacts brought back from the Dutch colonies in the East (esp. Dutch East India) by the botanist Frederik Willem van Eeden. Specifically, its collection consisted of anthropological and cultural artefacts and products from the East Indian archipelago. From 1871 the museum also performed research aimed at enhancing the production and processing of tropical products such as coffee beans, rattan and paraffin.

Dutch trade in Indonesia led to increased public interest in ethnology and in the way of life of people of the Tropics – and their welfare. Around the turn of the 20th century the size of collection and related research together with growth in visitor numbers led the museum to team up with an Association (‘Vereeniging Koloniaal Instituut’) that set about establishing a more ambitious Koloniaal Instituut (English, "Colonial Institute") in Amsterdam.

In 1910, the Colonial Institute was founded in Amsterdam. It was founded by the Ministry of the Colonies, the City of Amsterdam, the Artis Royal Zoo, and prominent businesses active in the Dutch colonies. Its members subsequently contributed funds for a new building to be located on the former Eastern Cemetery of Amsterdam. Three designs were tendered and the building commission chose that of Johannes van Nieukerken, who did not live to see out his work, which was completed by his sons M.A. and J. Van Nieukerken. Construction began in 1915. Materials were hard to find and expensive due to the outbreak of the First World War, and this caused long delays. Strikes, storm damage and harsh winters also led to delays. It took a total of 11 years to complete construction.

=== 1926-1949 ===
On the 9th of October 1926, Queen Wilhelmina opened the complex. Since that time, KIT has been housed in this historic, neo-renaissance building at the edge of the Oosterpark. The building has been designated as a national monument. In 1931 it hosted the World Social Economic Conference organised by the International Industrial Relations Institute.

During World War II, the German occupying forces housed the Grüne Polizei in the institute; at the same time, owing to the complicated architecture of the building (at one time the largest building in the city), the institute was a hotbed of resistance—it housed weapons and radios, and even Dutchmen hiding from the Germans: the grandson of Hendrikus Colijn, resistance fighter Hendrik Colijn, worked there under the alias Colijn, and when the building was searched by the Germans in 1944 he escaped through the labyrinthine passages in the attic.

In 1945 the Colonial Institute's name was changed to the Indisch Instituut (English, "Indies Institute").

=== 1950-present day ===
In 1950, after Dutch decolonization, the institute's mission changed. The process of Dutch decolonialisation went hand in hand with an evolution of its mission and vision. KIT's activities were no longer confined to the Netherlands’ former overseas territories and in 1952 a new name was adopted: the Royal Tropical Institute (KIT – Koninklijk Instituut voor de Tropen).

In the ensuing decades KIT grew into an association of scientists dedicated to international cooperation, intercultural understanding and the practical application of scientific knowledge for socio-economic development and health care amongst the diverse collection of newly independent nations that emerged in the post-colonial era.

As of May 2012, the institute's annual budget was over €40 million. In 2011 the Ministry of Foreign Affairs (Netherlands) had announced it would cease its €20 million annual subsidy, a decision appealed by the institute to the Dutch Council of State.

As a result of the Dutch government's withholding of subsidy, the entire collection of books and magazines (the Tropenbibliotheek) was moved. Parts of the collection were given to different institutions in the Netherlands, the so-called heritage collection and the colonial and modern map collections were placed at Leiden University Libraries. In October 2013 the Bibliotheca Alexandrina announced it would take in some 400,000 books and 20,000 magazines that otherwise would have been destroyed. In 2014 the Tropenmuseum became independent and merged with other Dutch Ethnographic Museums. In 2017, KIT launched SDG House, which is home to more than 50 organisations. It acts as a catalyst for sustainability initiatives: a place to meet, exchange ideas, identify synergies, and build enduring partnerships.

In March 2024, the institute, that had already been using the abbreviation KIT for many years, officially dropped the "Institute" and "Tropical" from its name and rebranded to just "KIT".

== Building design ==
The complex was built in the neo-renaissance style using one colour for the bricks and one type of natural stone for the finish. The main building, housing the primary entrance and professional departments, is located on the Mauritskade side. A low building with the shape of a semicircle connects the two buildings. At the corner of the Linnaeusstraat and Mauritskade is a large bell tower. Imposing features include the octagonal Marble Hall, the large Auditorium, and the museum's Hall of Light.

== Staff ==
Notable staff have included:

- J. G. ten Houten
- Johanna Bonne-Wepster
