= Berg en Dal (village) =

- Village
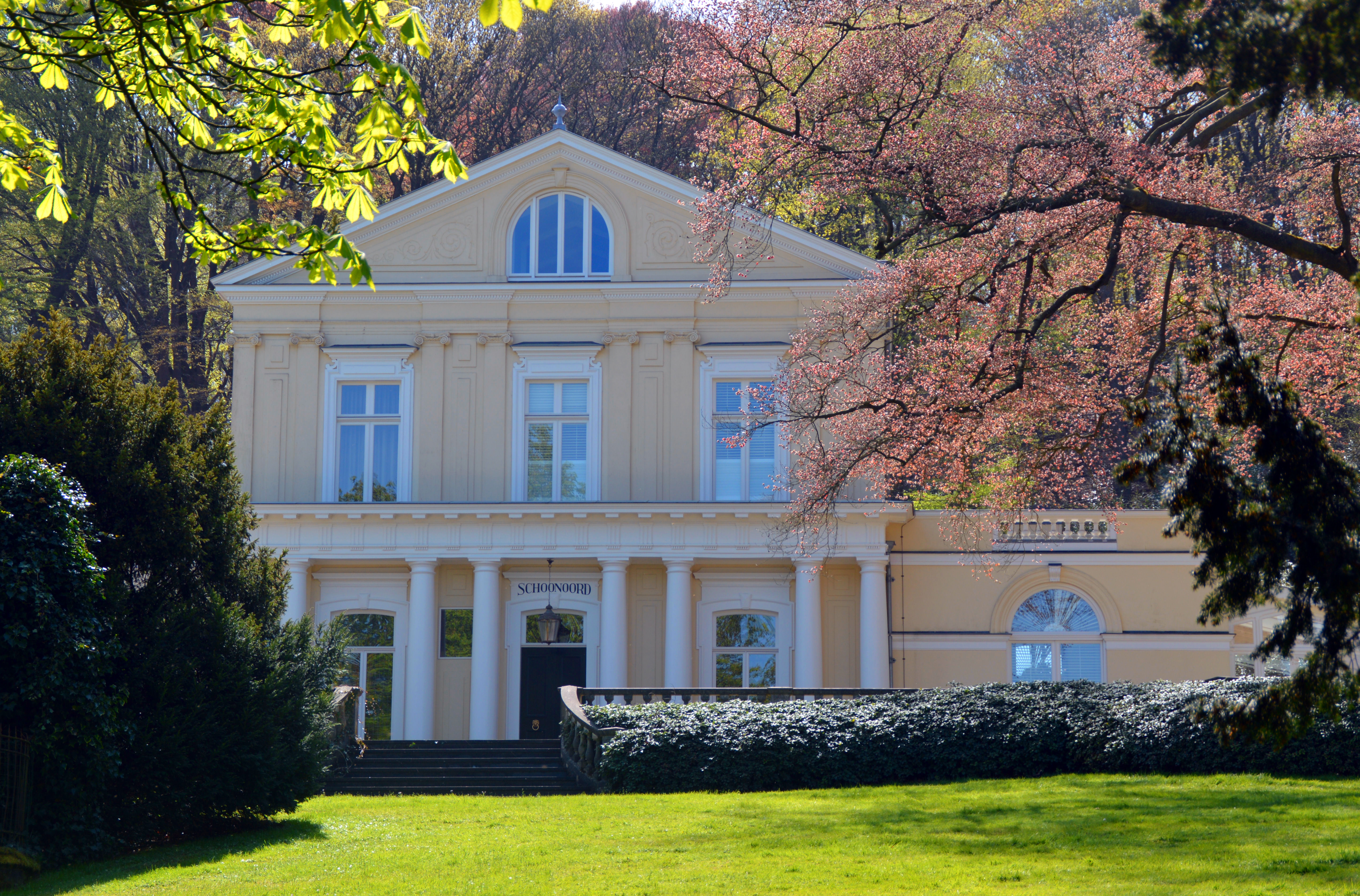
- Schoonoord estate

- Location in the province of Gelderland Berg en Dal (Netherlands)
- Coordinates: 51°49′N 5°55′E
- Country: Netherlands
- Province: Gelderland
- Municipality: Berg en Dal

Area
  - Total: 7.85 km^{2} (3.03 sq mi)
- Elevation: 87 m (285 ft)

Population (2021)
  - Total: 2,430
  - Density: 310/km^{2} (802/sq mi)
- Time zone: UTC+1 (CET)
  - Summer (DST): UTC+2 (CEST)
- Postal code: 6571 & 6572
- Dialing code: 024
- Major roads: N841

Berg en Dal is a village in the Dutch province of Gelderland. It is located to the southeast of the city of Nijmegen. The village lies in the municipality of Berg en Dal.

One of the attractions in the village is the Africa Museum, which consists of a number of African villages, rebuilt on a 1:1 scale. Another attraction is the small amusement park of Tivoli.

== History ==
The name of the village means "Mountain and Valley"; it refers to the hills in the neighbourhood. The name was first used in 1867. The village has its origins in the early Middle Ages, and developed on a hill along the road from Nijmegen to Kleve. It used to be surrounded by heath and contained little farms. In the early 19th century, it developed into a villa ward.

During Operation Market Garden, Berg en Dal was the scene of heavy fighting. The villagers were evacuated in November 1944. On 5 May 1955, an obelisk was revealed with the names of the 27 civilian casualties.

In 1949, Duivelsberg and Wylerberg were annexed from Germany. In 1954, the Africa Museum was opened. It was an initiative of Father Piet Bukkems and other missionaries who had worked in Africa to provide a visual display. Later, an African village was built in the museum.

== Gallery ==
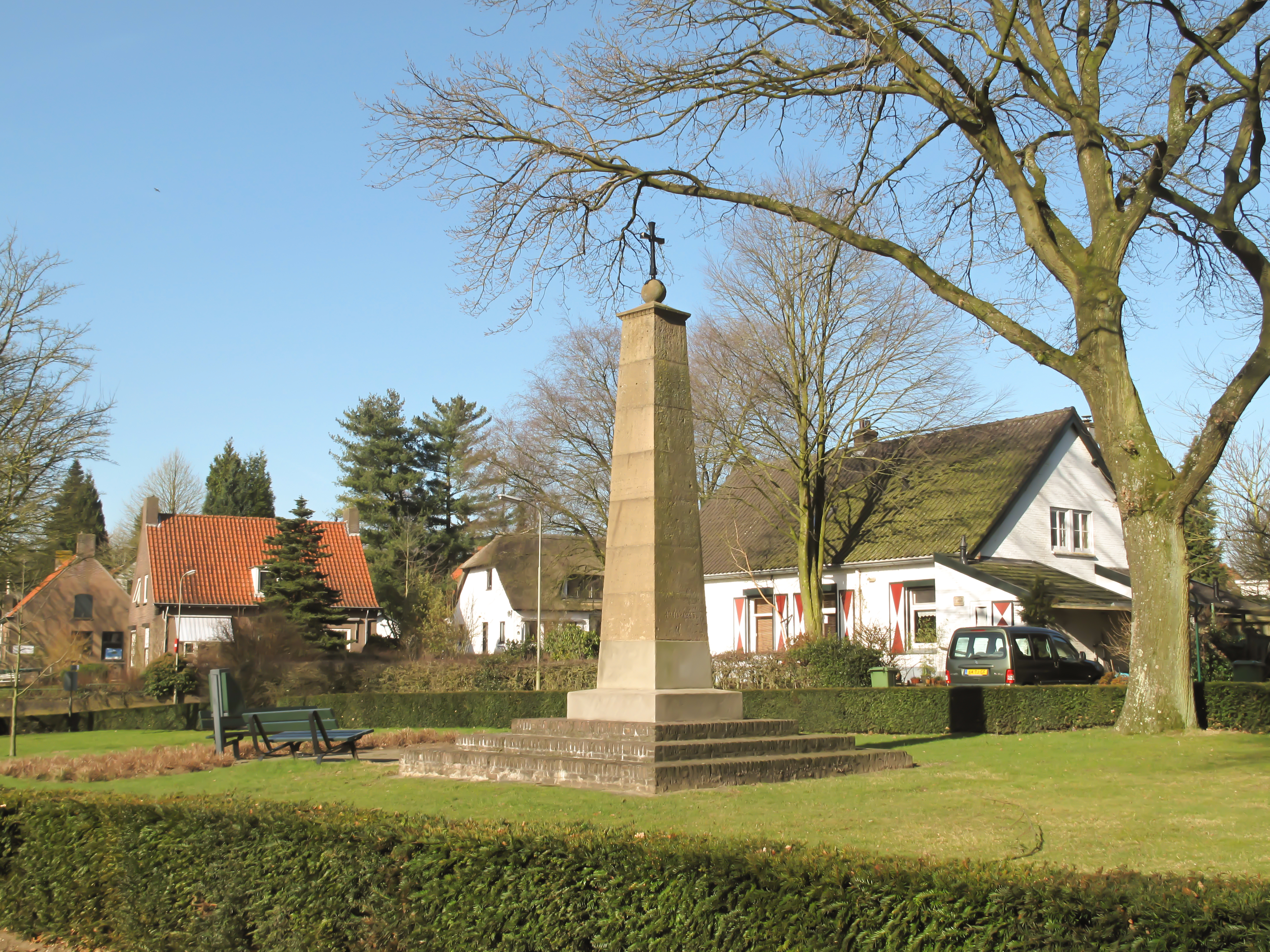
Berg en Dal, war memorial

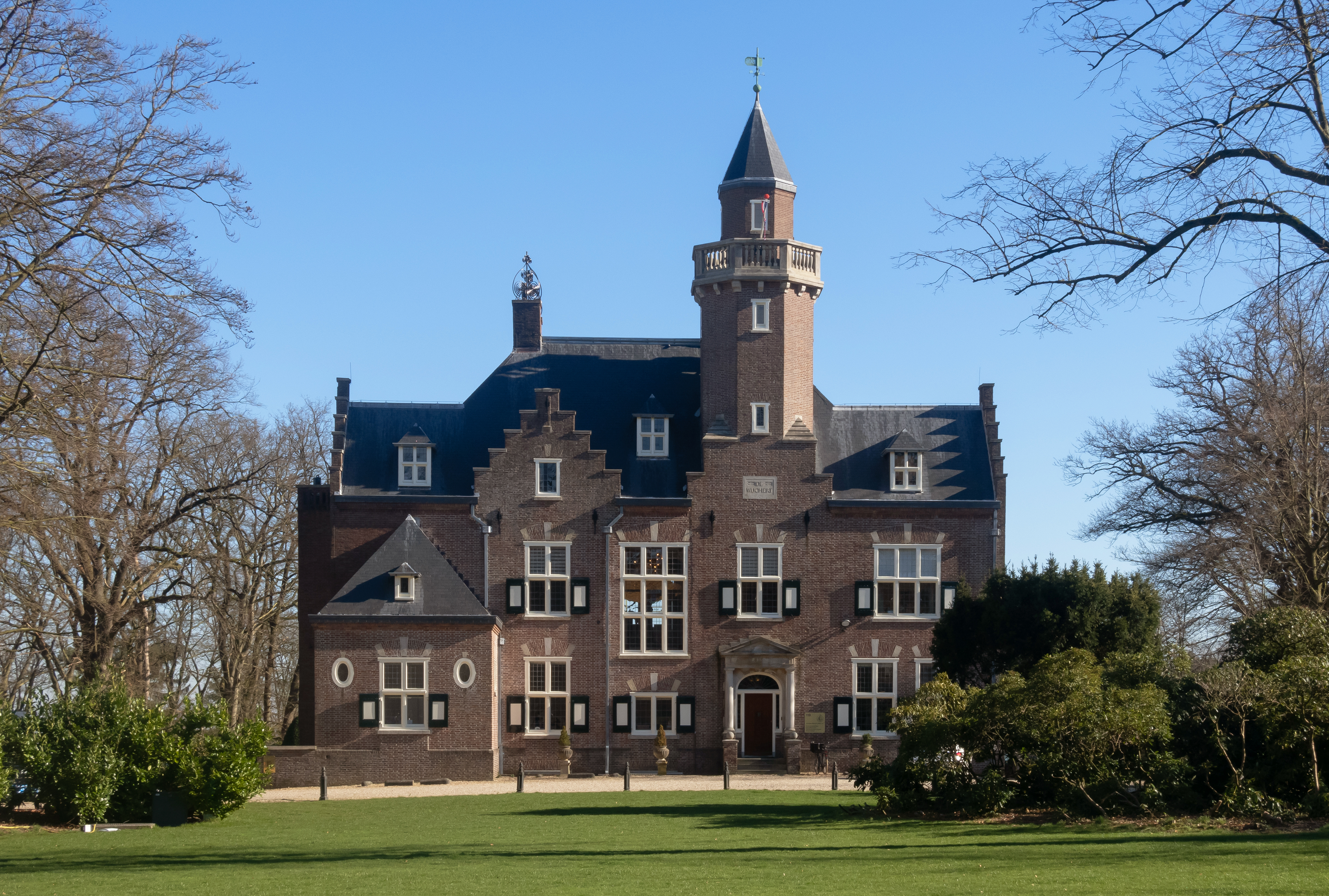
Real estate: Landgoed de Wychert

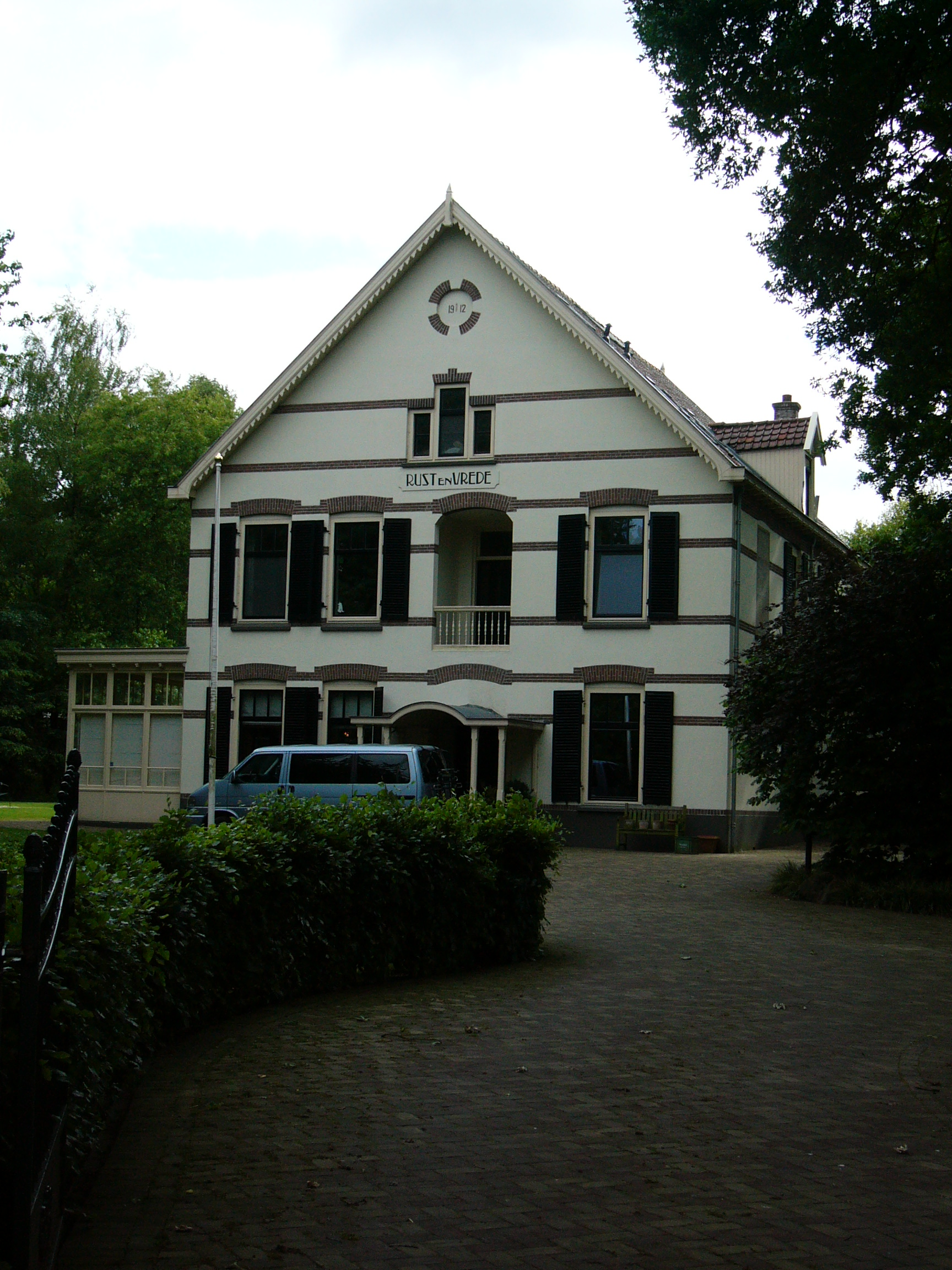
Rust en Vrede

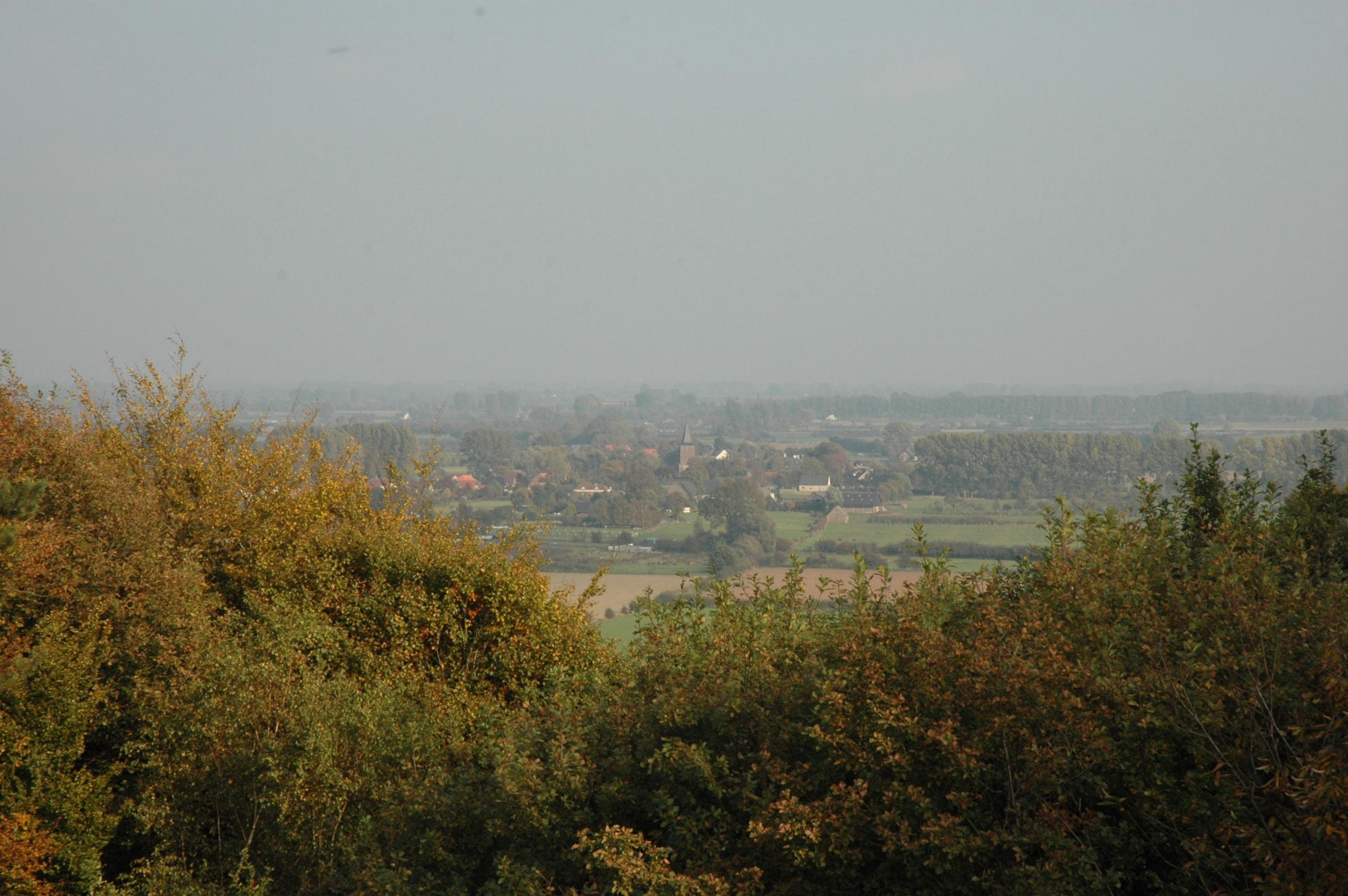
View from the Duivelsberg
