= Wereldmuseum Amsterdam =

Museum in Amsterdam, Netherlands

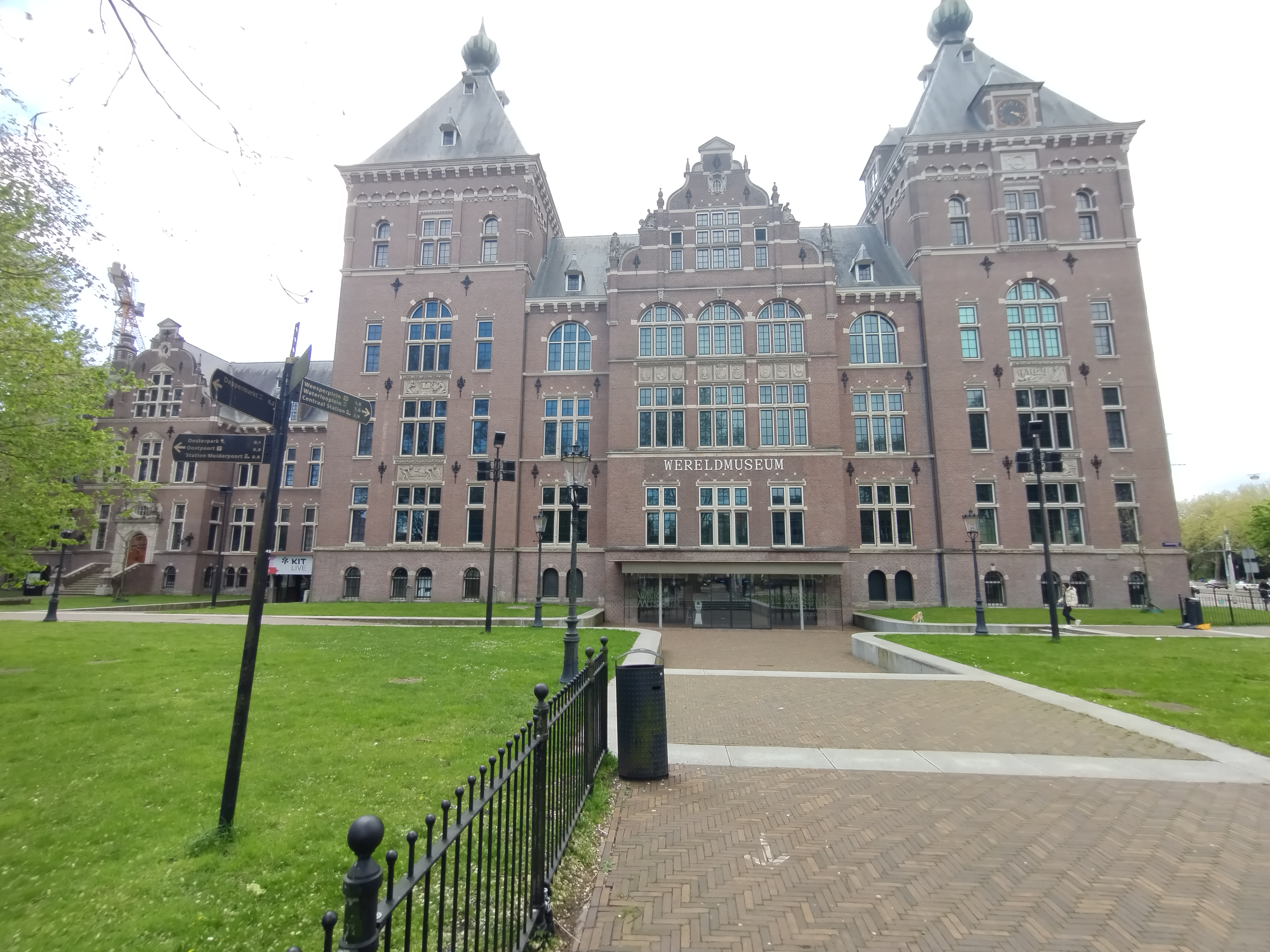
- Wereldmuseum in 2024

- Location of the museum in Amsterdam
- Former name: Tropenmuseum; Koloniaal Museum (Colonial Museum)
- Established: 1864
- Location: Linnaeusstraat 2, Amsterdam, Netherlands
- Coordinates: 52.362692°N 4.922517°E
- Type: Anthropological museum
- Collection size: 340,000 objects and photographs
- Visitors: 317.572 visitors (2022)
- Founder: Frederick van Eeden
- Directors: Wayne Modest & Marieke van Bommel
- Public transit access: Alexanderplein; GVB tram lines 1, 3, 14, 19

The Wereldmuseum Amsterdam, previously known as Tropenmuseum between 1950 and 2023, is an ethnographic museum with its headquarters in Amsterdam, Netherlands. It was originally founded in Haarlem, Netherlands in 1864 under the name Koloniaal Museum (English: Colonial Museum) and later renamed Tropenmuseum (English: Museum of the Tropics).

The Wereldmuseum is one of the largest museums in Amsterdam. It has a permanent exhibition of part of its collection and hosts temporary exhibitions, including contemporary, modern and traditional visual arts and photographic works. The museum is part of the Nationaal Museum van Wereldculturen (Museum of World Cultures), a combination of three ethnographic museums in the Netherlands.

== History ==
Frederick van Eeden, father of the writer Frederik van Eeden, and secretary of the Maatschappij ter bevordering van Nijverheid (English: Society for the Promotion of Industry) established the Koloniaal Museum (English: Colonial Museum) in Haarlem in 1864, and opened the museum to the public in 1871. The museum was founded in order to show Dutch overseas possessions, and the inhabitants of these foreign countries, such as Indonesia. In 1871 the institute began research to increase profits made off the colonies. This included attempting to develop improved means of producing coffee beans, rattan and paraffin. The museum came under the influence of ethnologists, who added information on the economy, manners, and customs of the inhabitants. In 1926, they inaugurated the current building in East Amsterdam. At the time, they had 30,000 objects, and a sizable collection of photographs.

Following the independence of Indonesia in 1945, the scope of the museum changed from just the colonial possessions of the Netherlands, to that of many undeveloped colonial states in South America, Africa, and Asia. In the 1960s and 1970s the Dutch Ministry of Foreign Affairs encouraged the museum to expand its scope to more social issues such as poverty and hunger. In the early 1970s a new wing for children was added. This wing is now called Tropenmuseum Junior.

Until March 2014 the museum was owned and operated by the Royal Tropical Institute, a foundation that sponsored the study of tropical cultures around the world. The museum had 317,572 visitors in 2022.

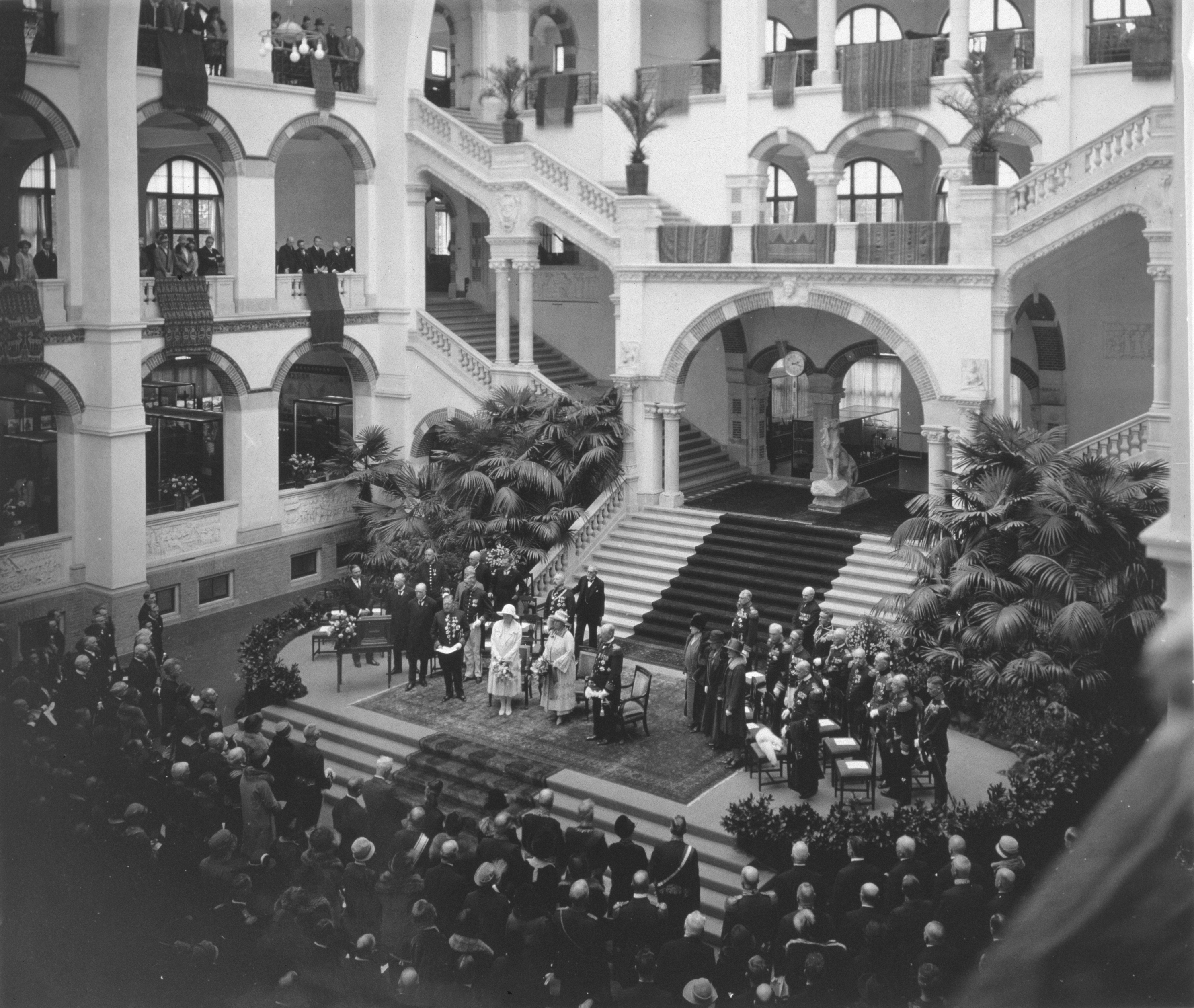
The opening of the Colonial Institute by Queen Wilhelmina, 1926.

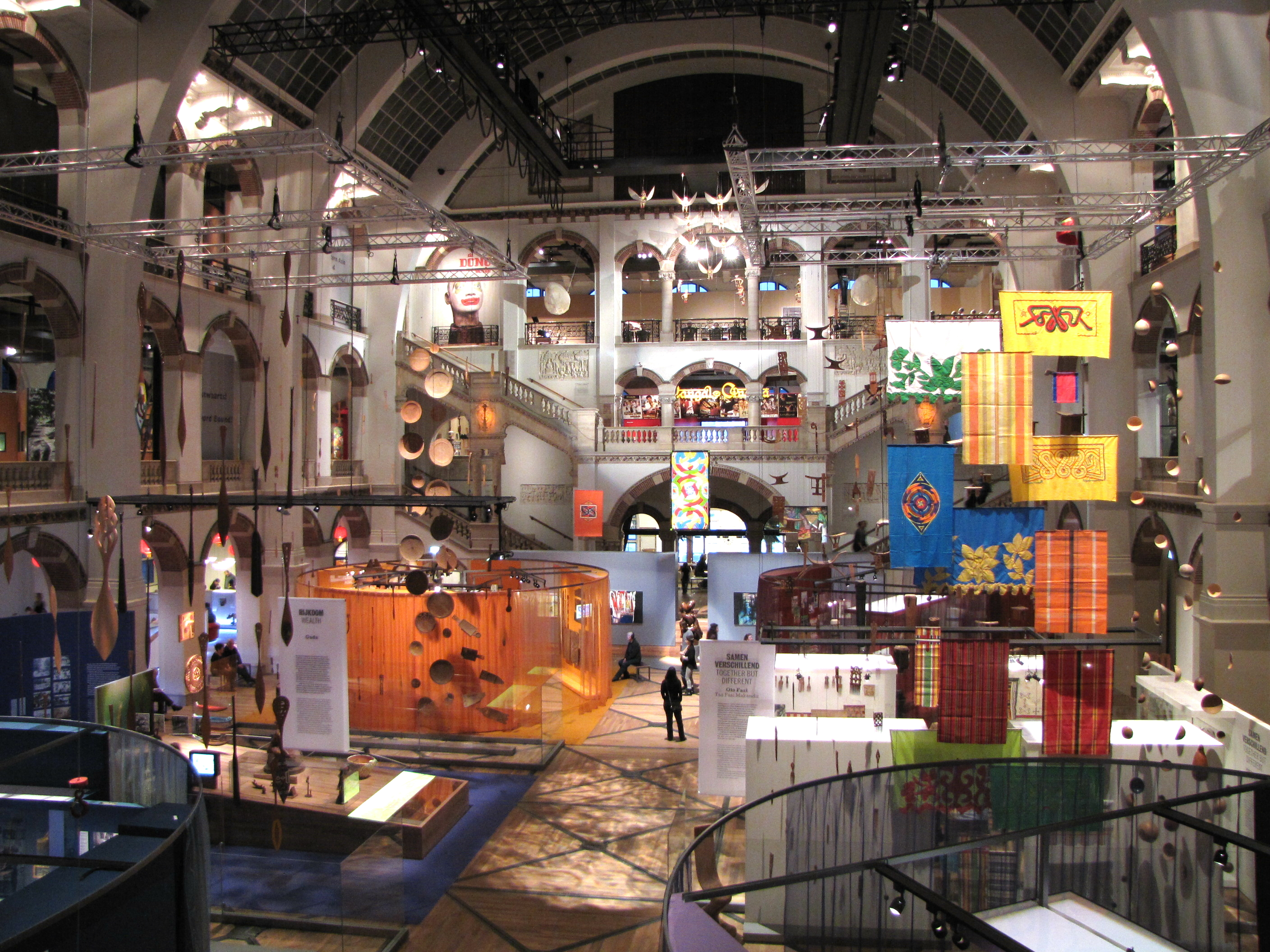
Interior of the museum.

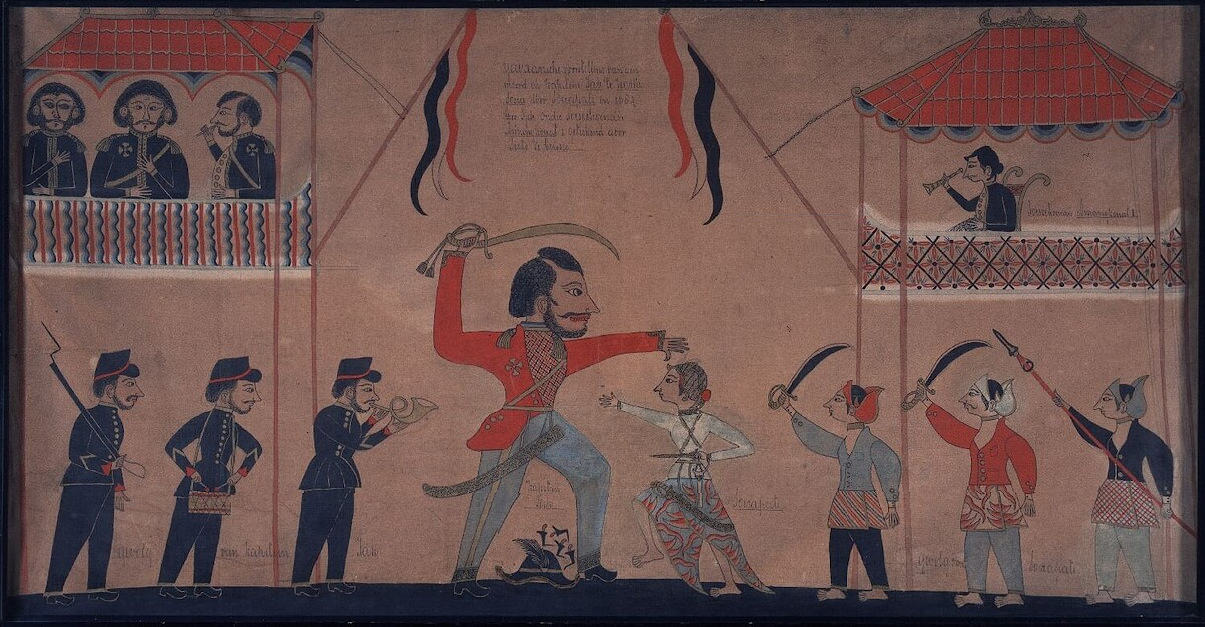
Traditional Javanese illustration of Captain Tack's death during the Trunajaya Rebellion, kept at the Tropenmuseum.

=== Facility ===
The original building, officially opened in 1926, was designed by Johannes Jacobus van Nieukerken and Marie Adrianus van Nieukerken. It was richly decorated for the time, and took 11 years to build due to World War I and various labor strikes. All of the artwork in the building was created in the first half of the 20th century. In 2003, the museum was listed as a historical building in Amsterdam.

== Collections ==
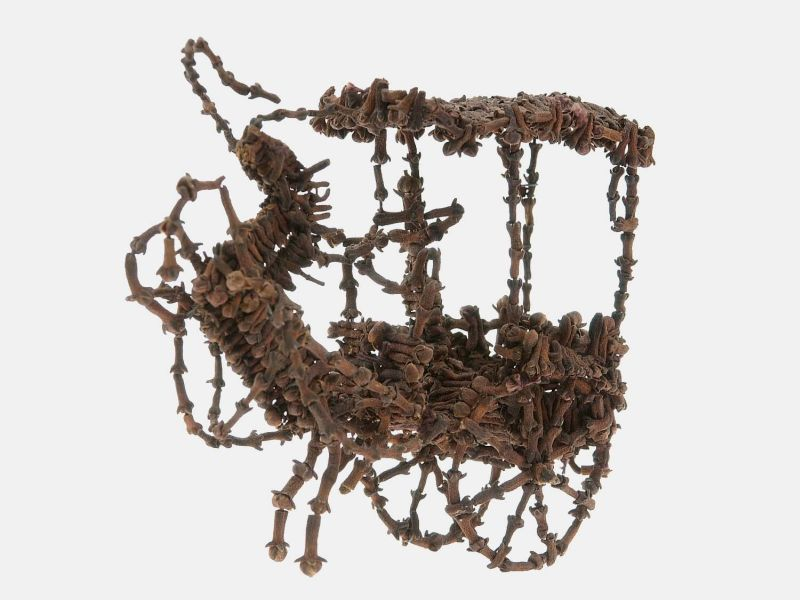
Clove model of a two-wheeled horse-drawn coach with coachman

Until the merger in 2014, the museum collection contained 175,000 objects, 155,000 photographs and 10,000 miscellaneous drawings, paintings, and documents. It inherited 15,000 of these from the Ethnographisch Museum Artis. These objects are split up into many collections. The museum houses collections for many geographical areas such as Southeast Asia, South Asia, West Asia, North Africa, Sub-Saharan Africa, Latin America and the Caribbean. They also have several collections in storage that fall outside of their scope. These include collections for China, Japan, Korea, and Europe.

The photography collection consists mainly of historical photographs of the former Dutch Colonies from 1855 to 1940. In the period 2009–15 the Tropemmuseum released 50,000 photographs under a Creative Commons licence to the Wikimedia Commons.

A theatric collection is housed at the Wereldmuseum Amsterdam as well. The collection houses 5,500 musical instruments as well as various other theatrical objects such as masks and puppets. It also features 21,000 textile artifacts, a majority of which are from Indonesia. Tropenmuseum Junior is a sub-museum. It features interactive exhibits, and draws 30,000 children a year.

== See also ==
- Nationaal Museum van Wereldculturen
- Dutch East Indies
