= Scuola Grande dei Carmini =

Coordinates: 45°26′02″N 12°19′21″E

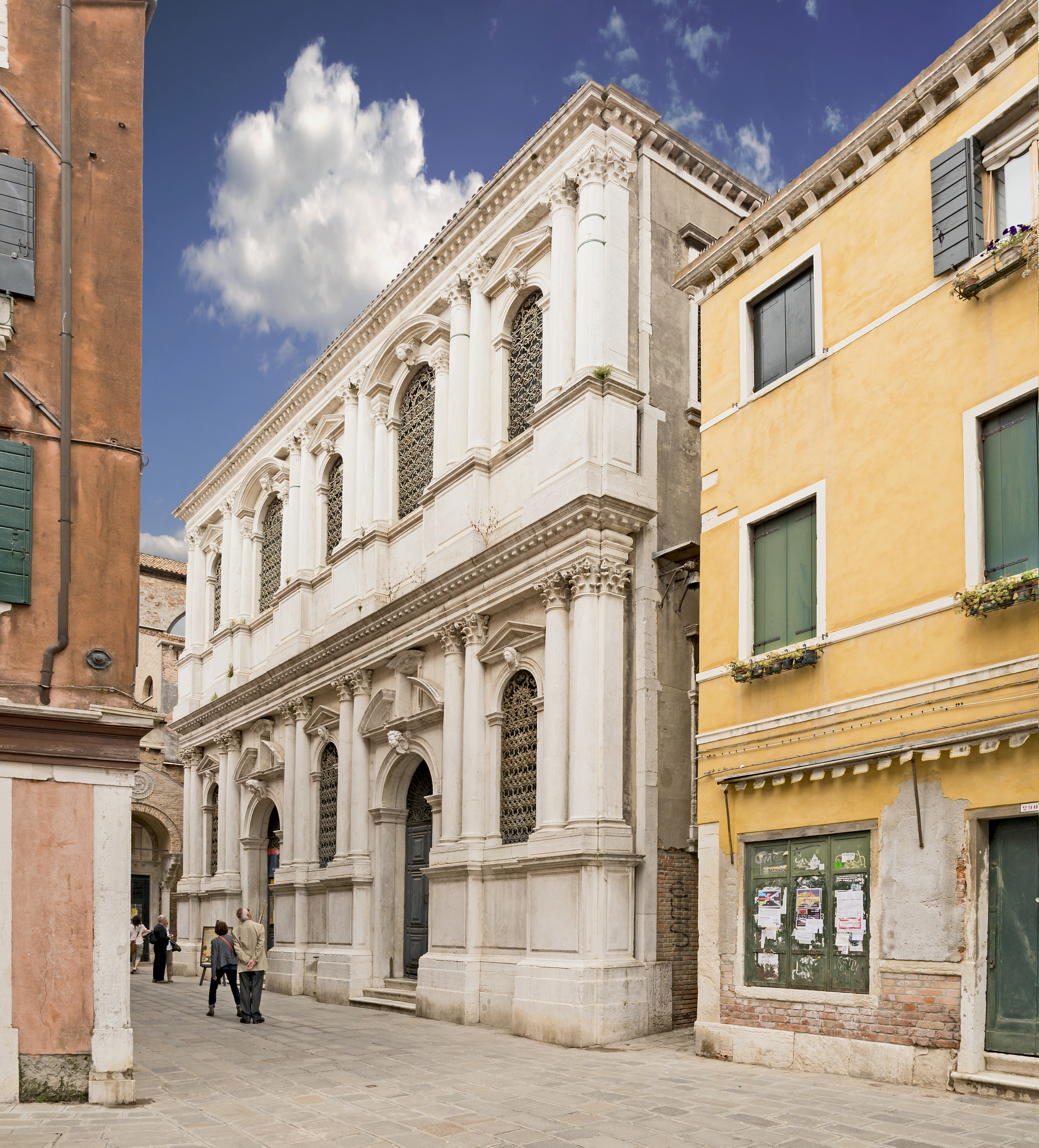
Facade facing Campo Santa Margherita

The Scuola Grande dei Carmini is a confraternity building in Venice, Italy. It is located in the sestiere of Dorsoduro, before Campo dei Carmini and Campo Santa Margherita, upon which its facade looks. It stands, separated by an alley, to the northeast of the church of Santa Maria dei Carmini.

== History ==
It was the former home of the Venetian Scuola of the same name. The Scuola was founded in 1594 under Doge Pasquale Cicogna, and was the last of its kind to be recognized as a Scuola Grande in 1767 by the Council of Ten. Initially it was located in the Convent of the Church of Carmini, whose structure also faces the campo of the same name. The present scuola building was designed by Francesco Caustello and Baldassare Longhena. In 1807, the confraternity was suppressed by Napoleon's anticlerical decrees. The Austrians allowed the Scuola to reopen, and it continues activities today, though mostly cultural activities.

== Exterior ==
The entrance facade and porch are of Baroque style, are facing south and overlook the southwestern tip of Campo Santa Margherita, while the west facade is parallel to the left of the nave of Carmini church. and visible from Campo dei Carmini.

The whiteness of the two facades is due to their Istrian stone surface and opposes the black thick wrought iron balustrades that close all the windows of the building.

== Interior ==
The Scuola dei Carmini contains many works of great artistic value, due to their presence in their original location.

=== The Chapel of Our Lady of Mount Carmel ===
Inside the school, on the ground floor, there is a large chapel (Cappella della Madonna del Carmelo) with a single nave, baroque style, the ceiling is apparent woodwork is remarkable. The main altar is dedicated to Our Lady of Mount Carmel, protector of the brotherhood, the painting of the altarpiece, an oil on canvas of the Venetian painter Sante Piatti, represents it.

The piece is entirely decorated with grisaille paintings by Niccolò Bambini. On the left wall the circumcision of Jesus, surrounding the access to the staircase of Baldassare Longhena, Faith, Hope and Charity. On the right wall The rest of the holy family in Egypt and the Assumption of the Virgin.

From this room, to the right of the stairs you can access the sacristy, a small room covered by a barrel vault and embellished by the original wooden seats.

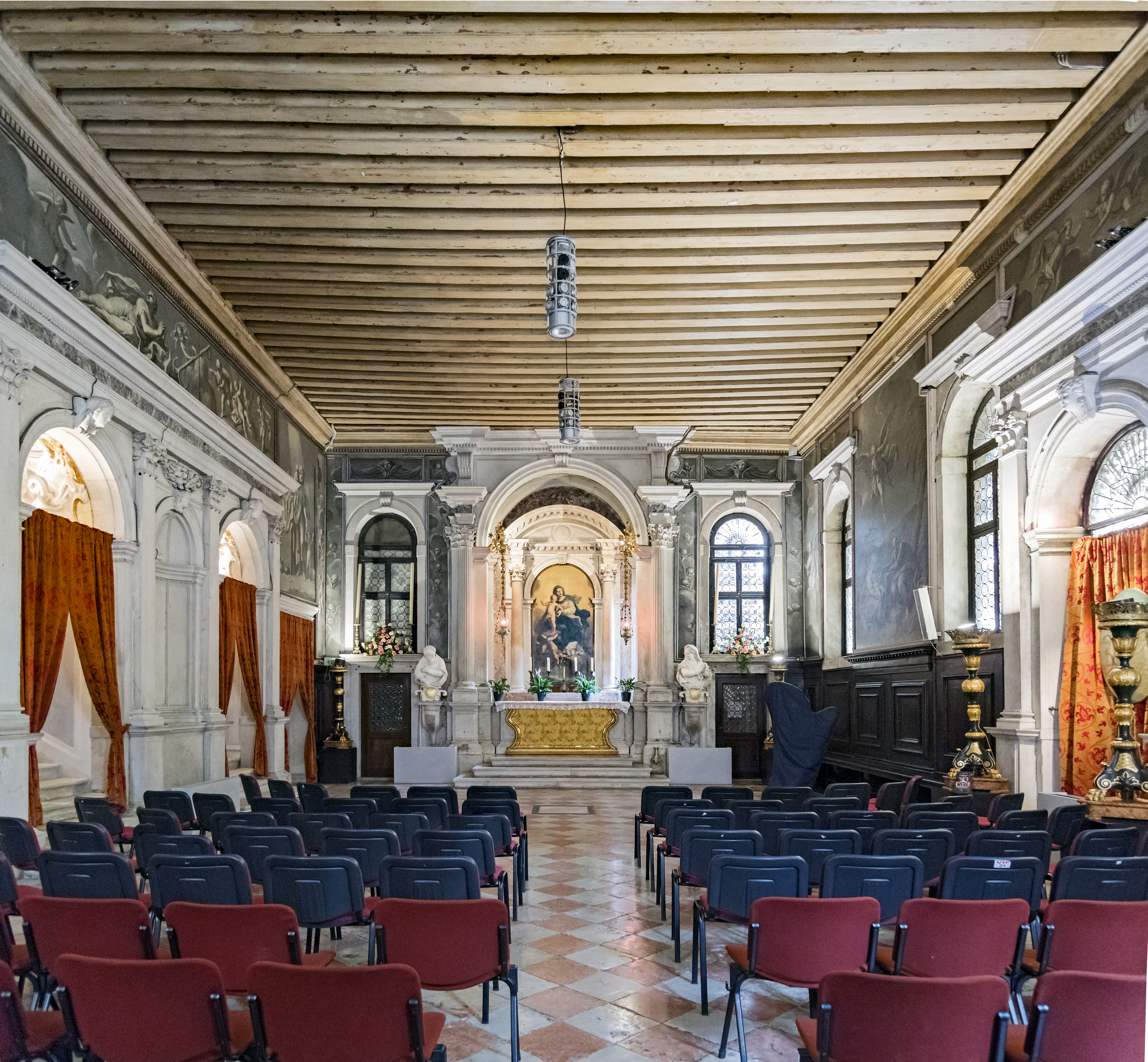
The Chapel of Our Lady of Mount Carmel

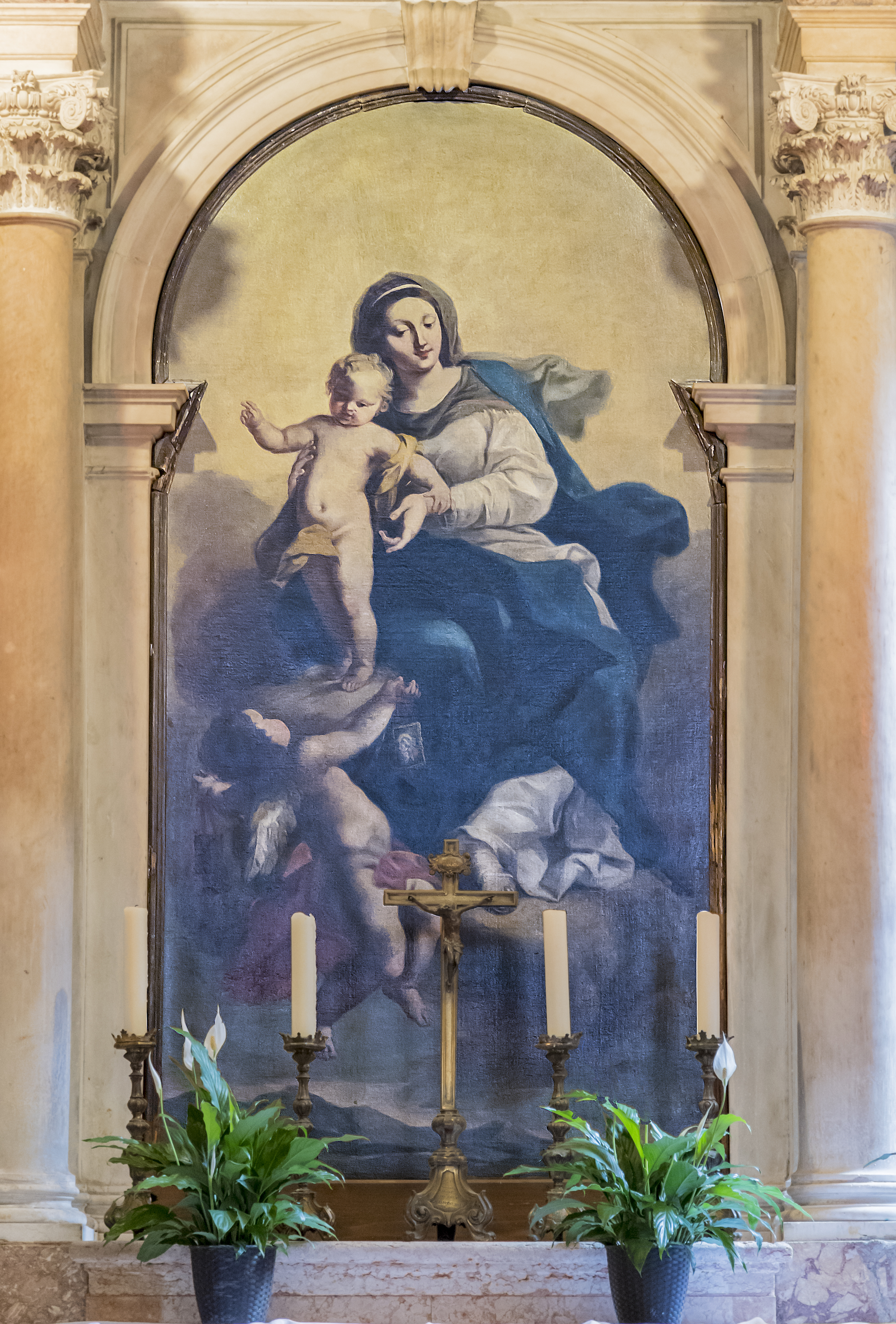
Our Lady of Mount Carmel by Sante Piatti

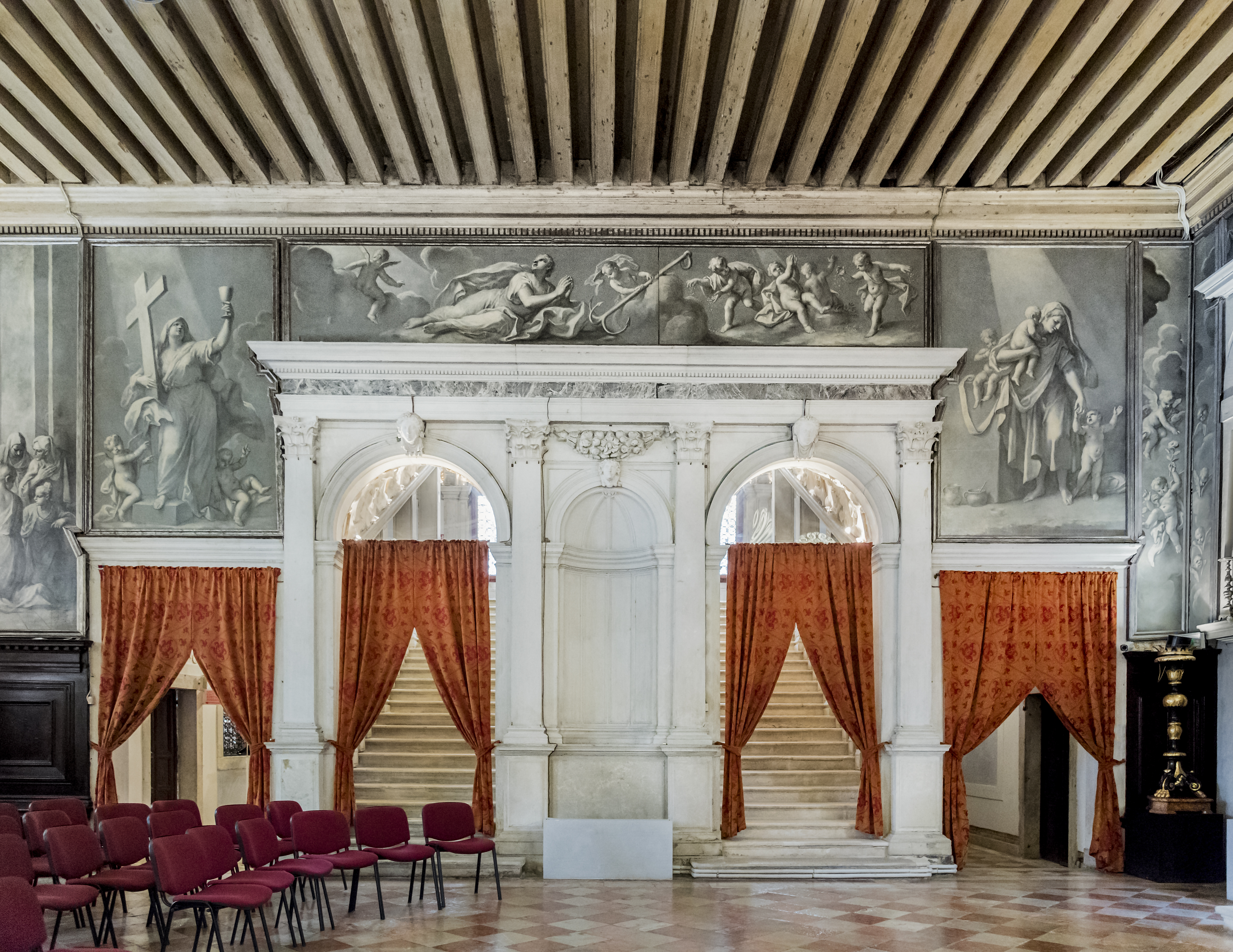
the staircase of Baldassare Longhena
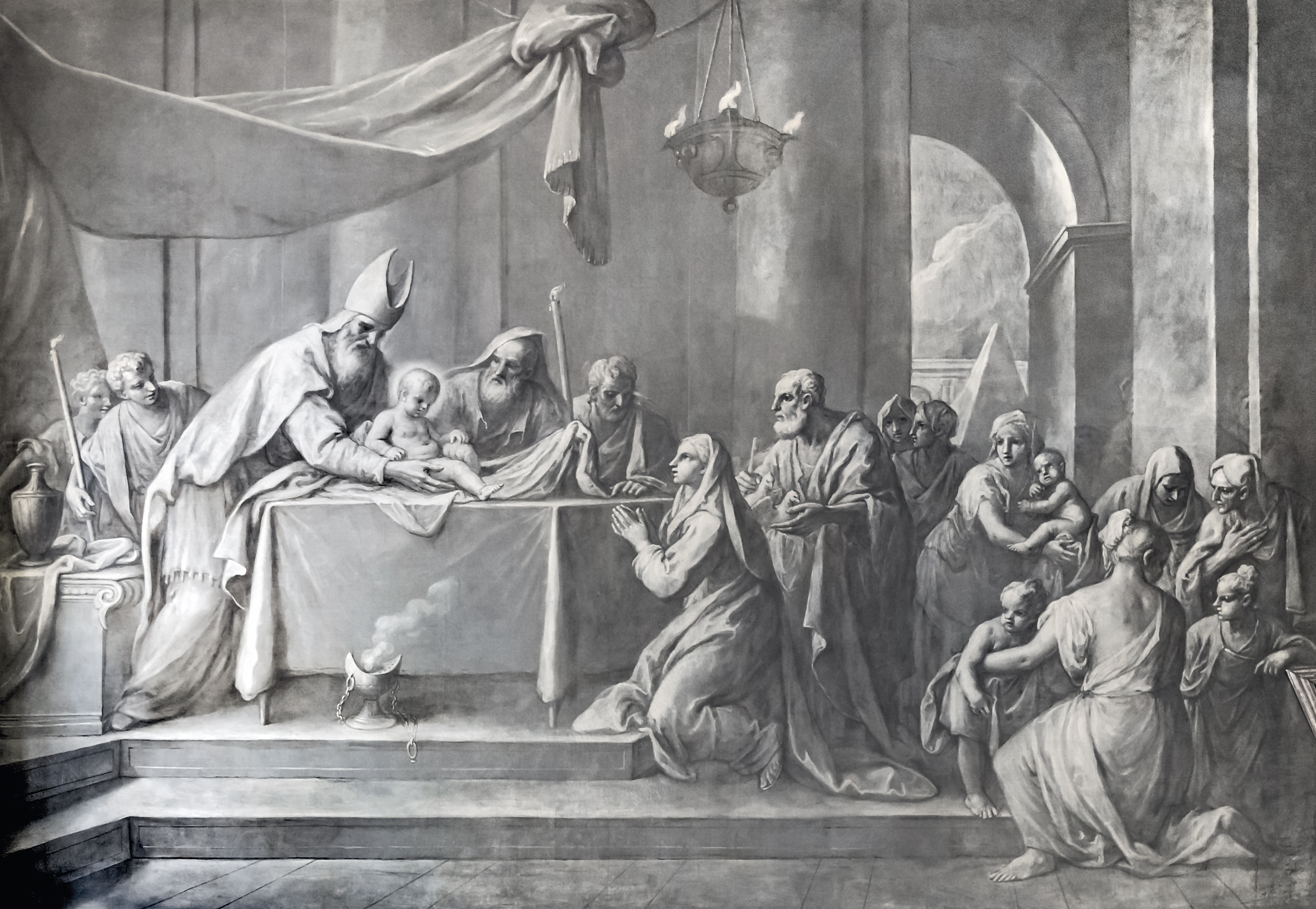
The circumcision of Jesus by Niccolò Bambini

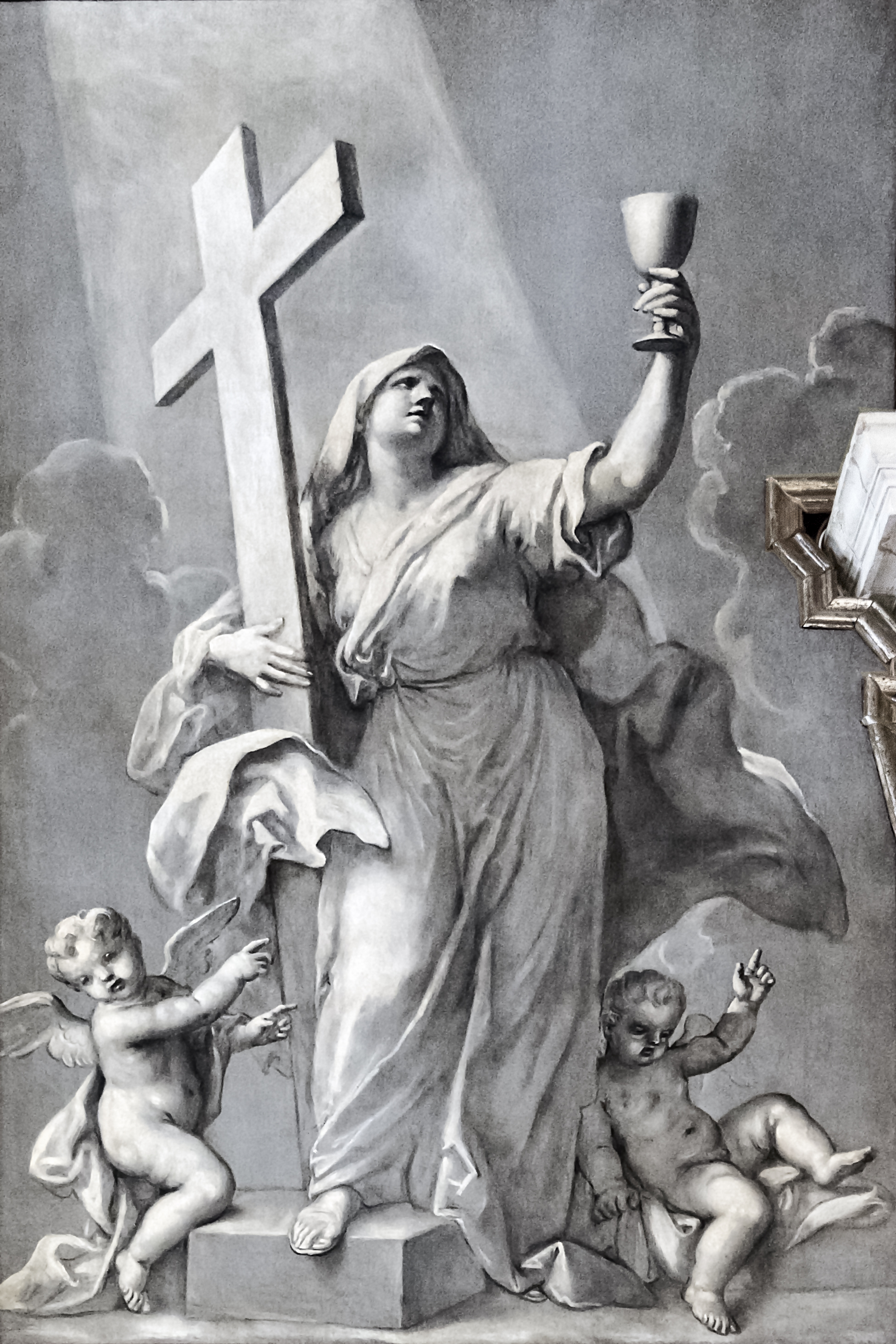
Faith by Niccolò Bambini

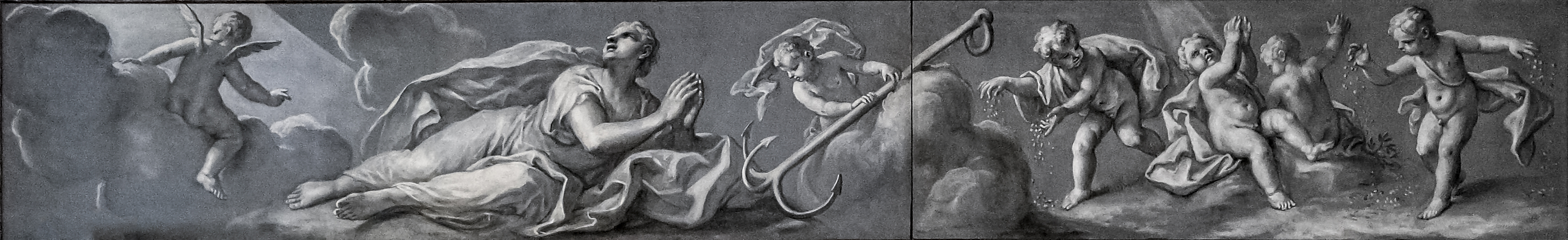
Hope by Niccolò Bambini

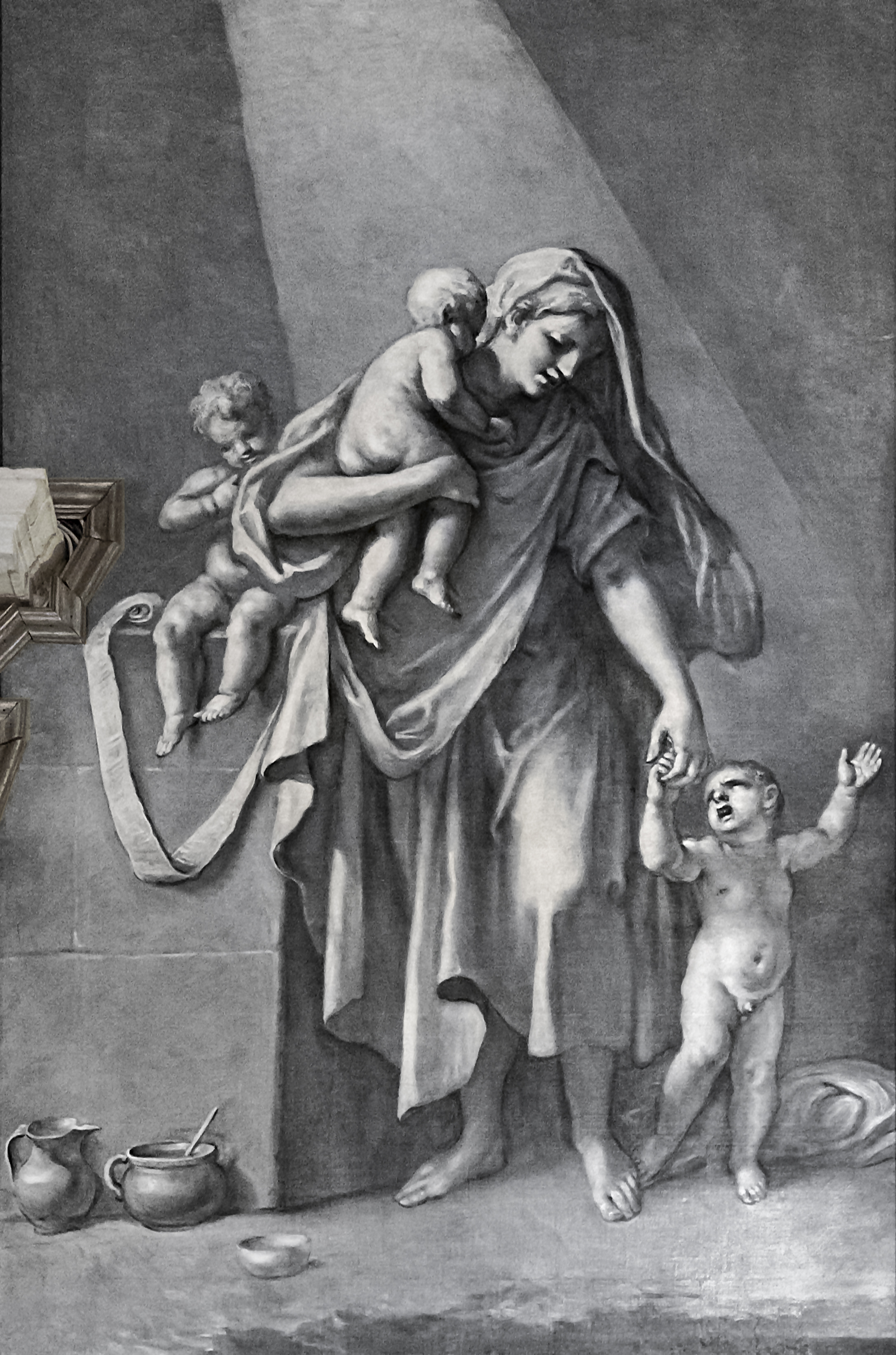
Charity by Niccolò Bambini

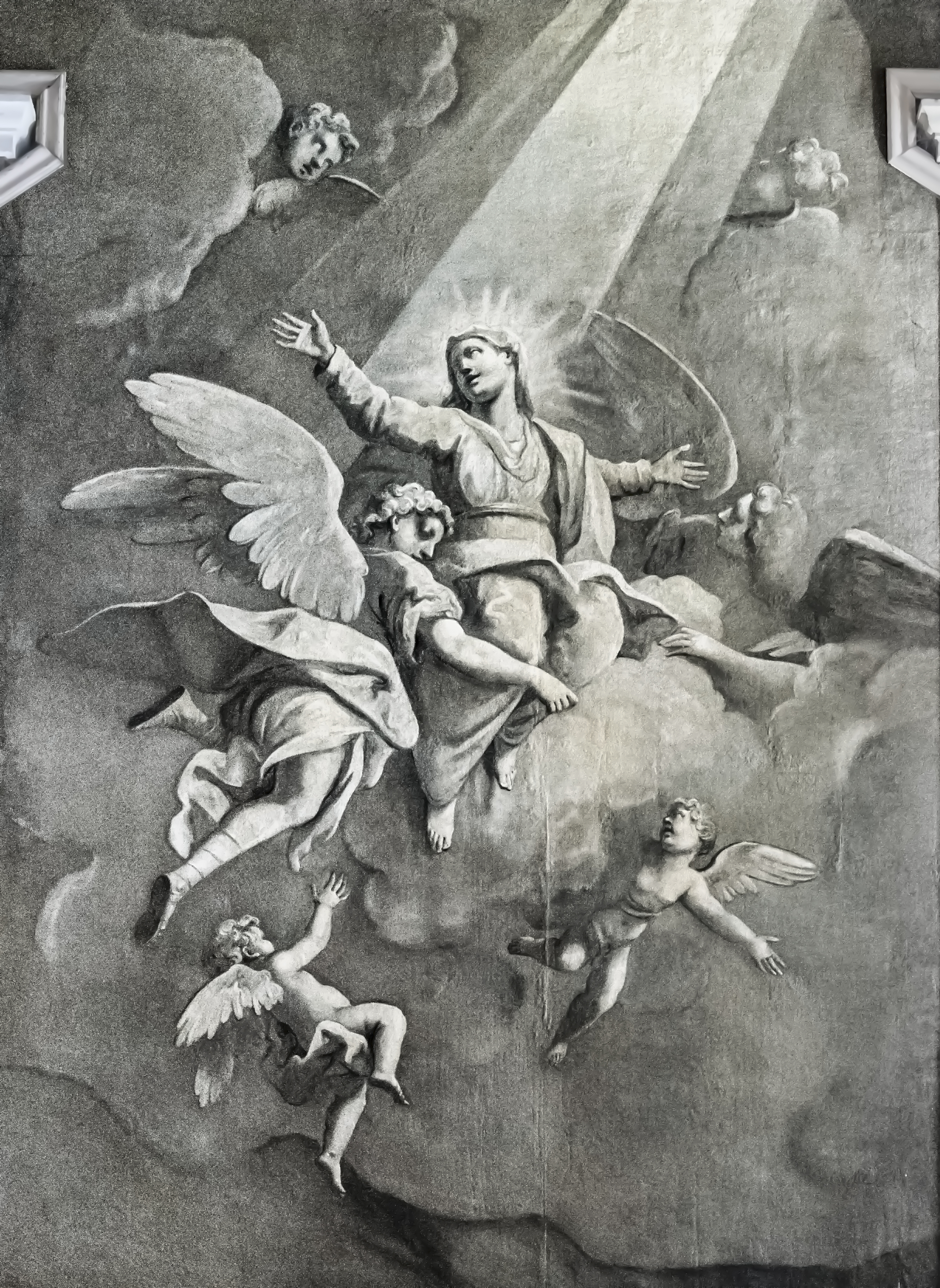
the Assumption of the Virgin by Niccolò Bambini

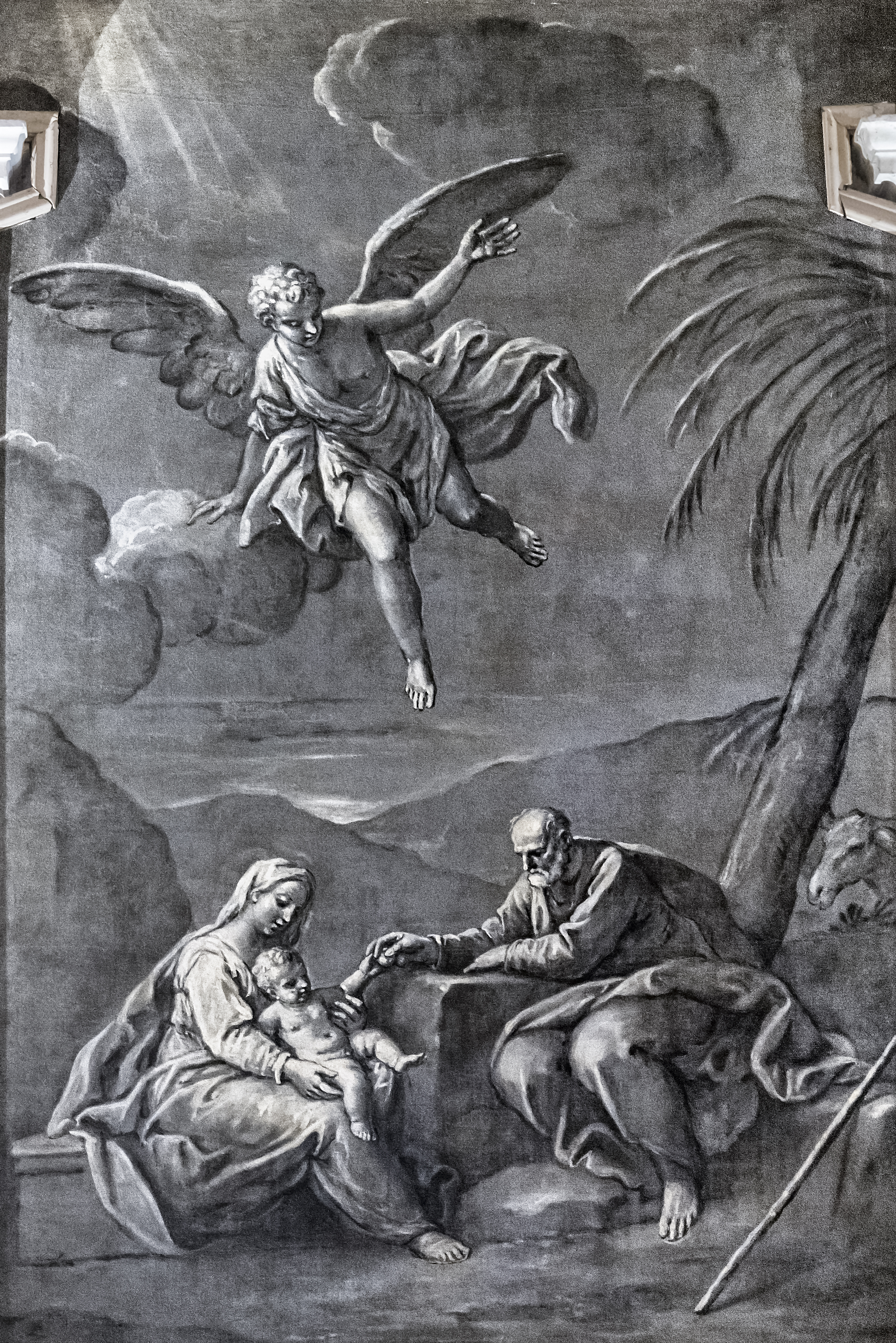
The rest of the holy family in Egypt by Niccolò Bambini

=== The stairs and the corridor ===
The grand staircase and the corridor with barrel vaults on a drawing of Baldassare Longhena, were made by his pupil Antonio Gaspari. The sculptures are the work of Alvise Bassi and were erected between 1728 and 1729. Three medallions in the last ramp show the theological virtues, the frescoes of Sante Piatti date from 1733.

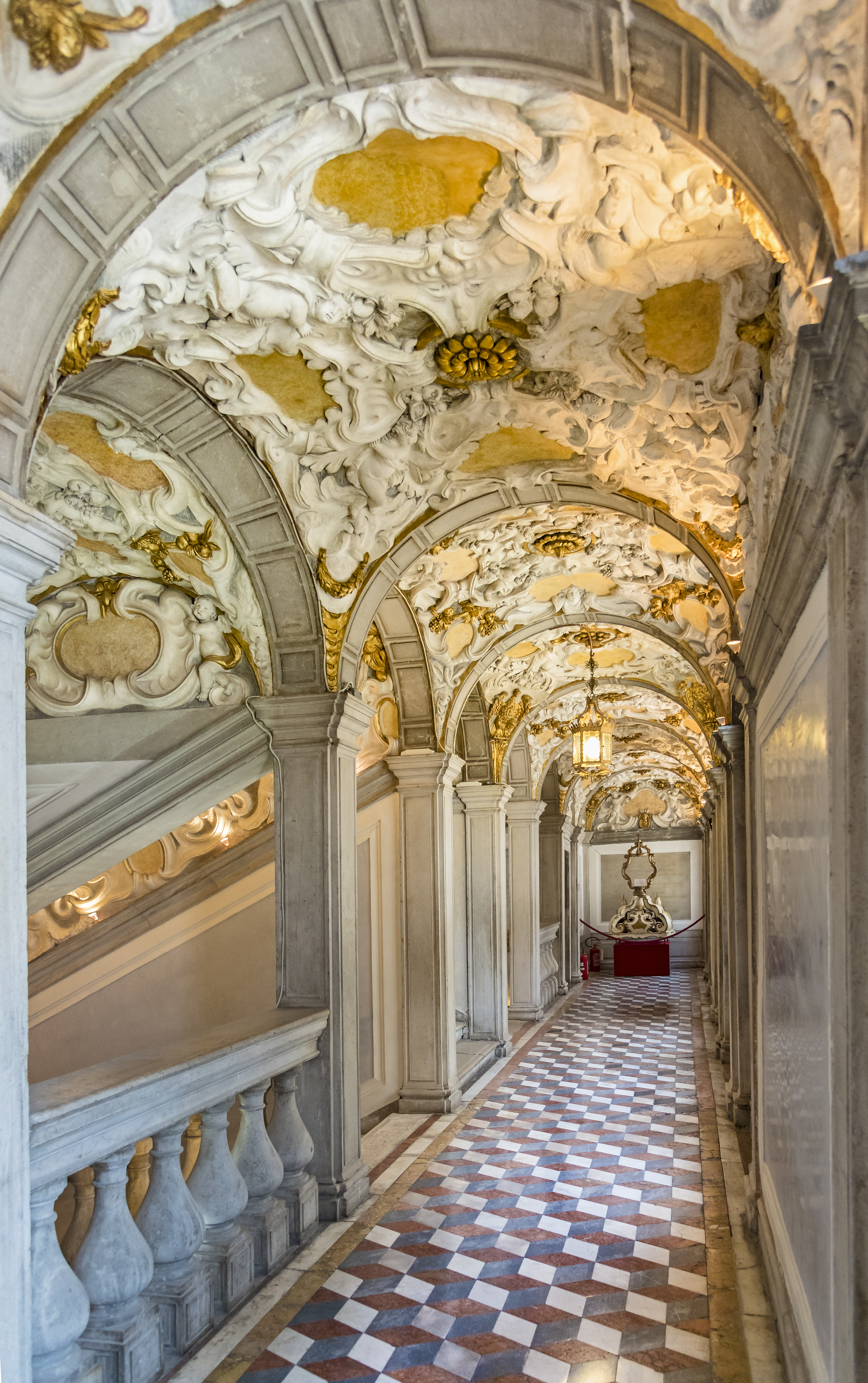
The corridor

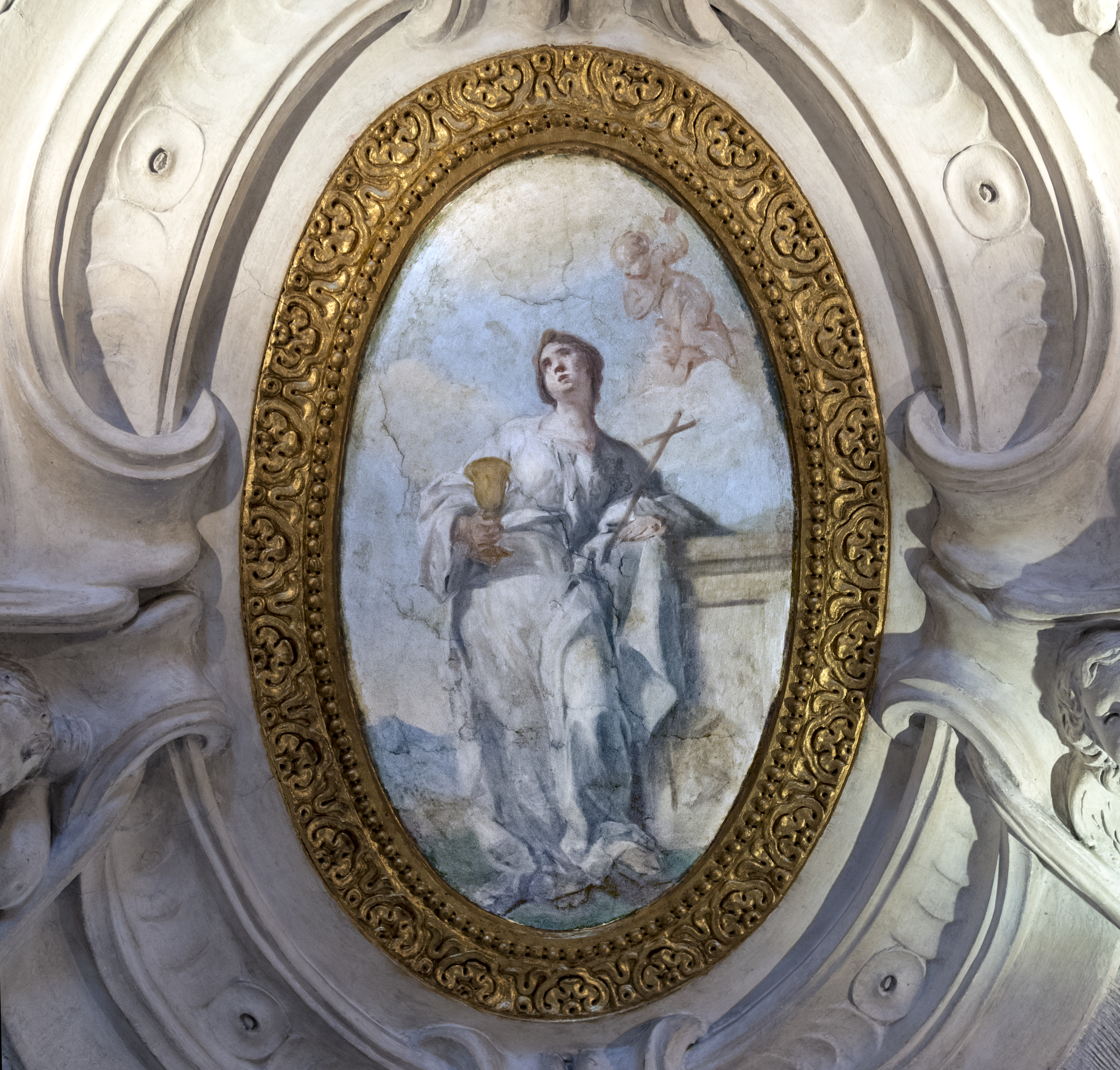
Faith by Sante Piatti

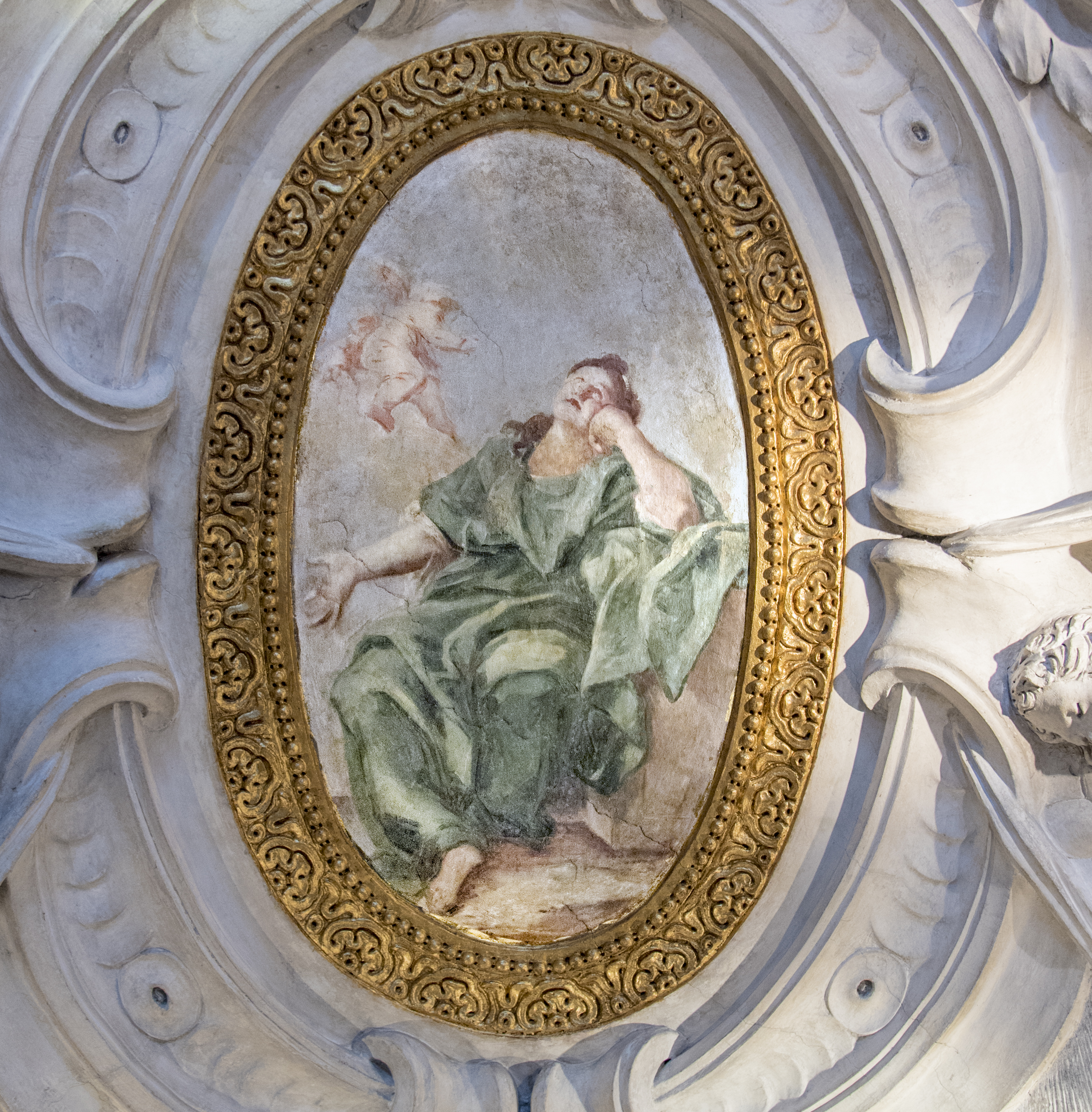
Hope by Sante Piatti

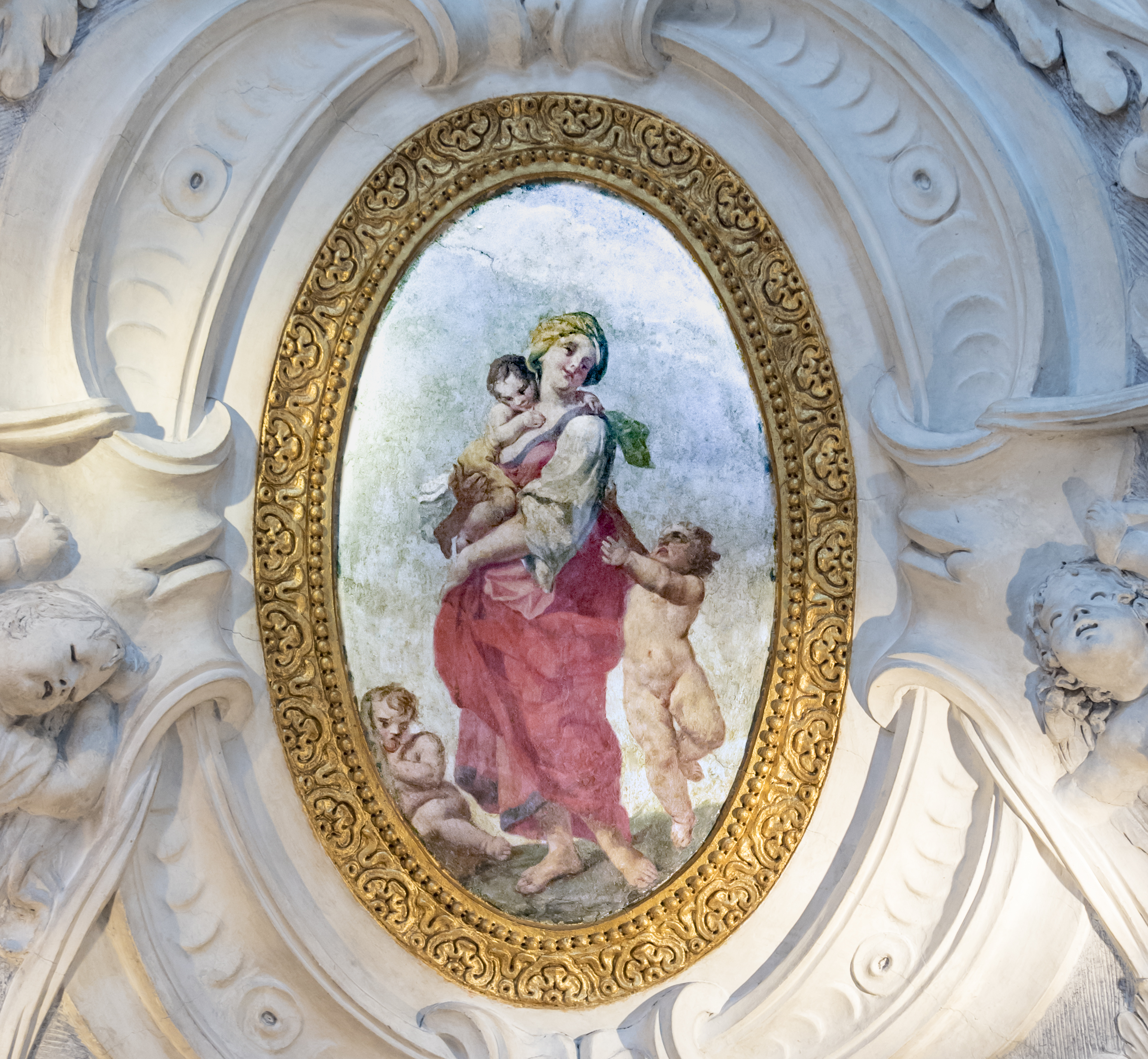
Charity by Sante Piatti

=== The capitular hall ===
It is the largest of the rooms and contains famous frescoes (actually paintings on canvas in the ceiling) completed by Giambattista Tiepolo from 1739 to 1749. The stuccoes are by the Swiss decorator Abbondio Stazio (1740), gilded by Carpoforo Mazzeti from 1742 to 1743. In the hall there is an altar dedicated to the Virgin with a statue of the Madonna and Child offering the scapular; it dates from the 17th century and is by Bernardo Falconi.

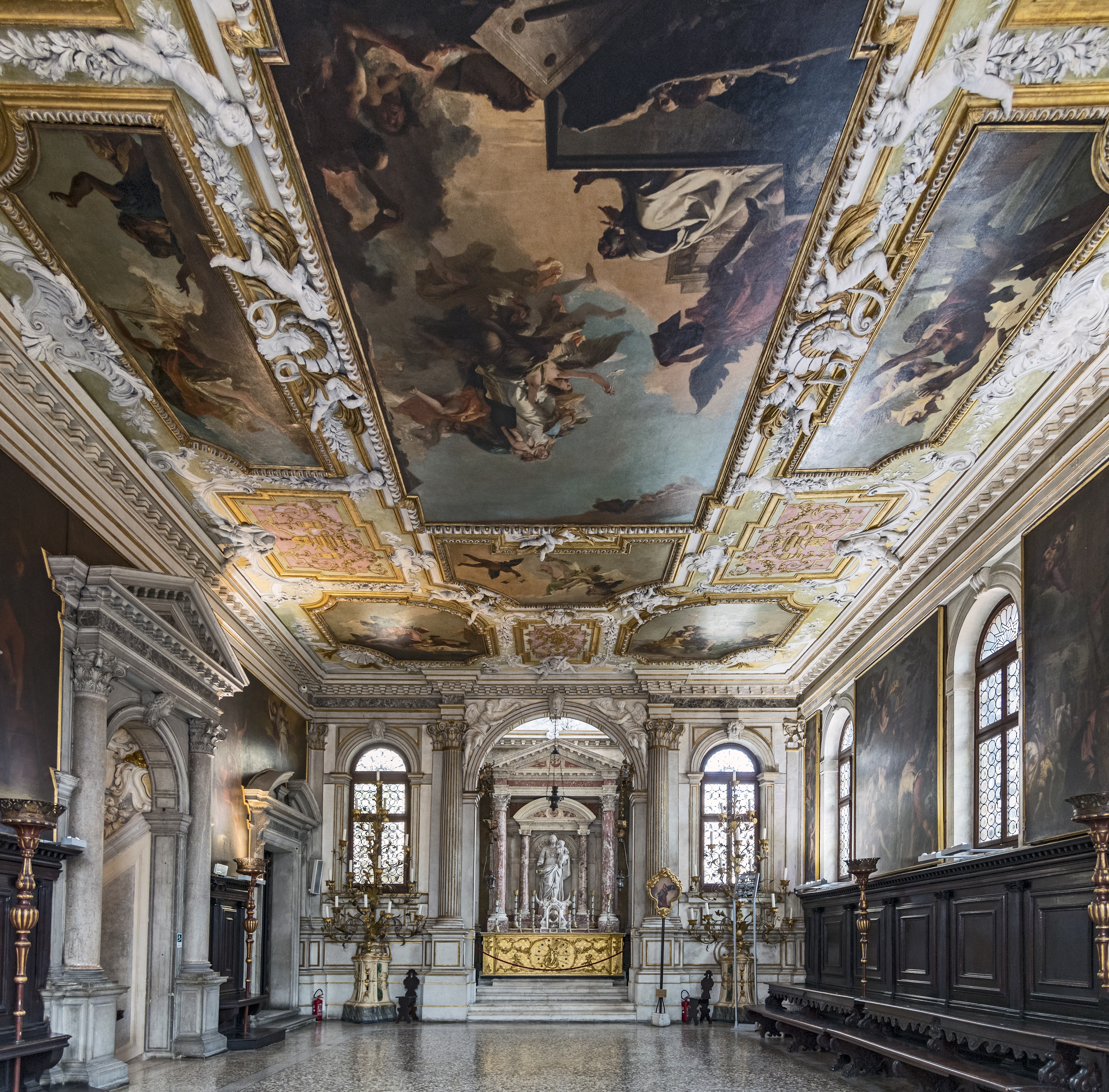
The capitular hall

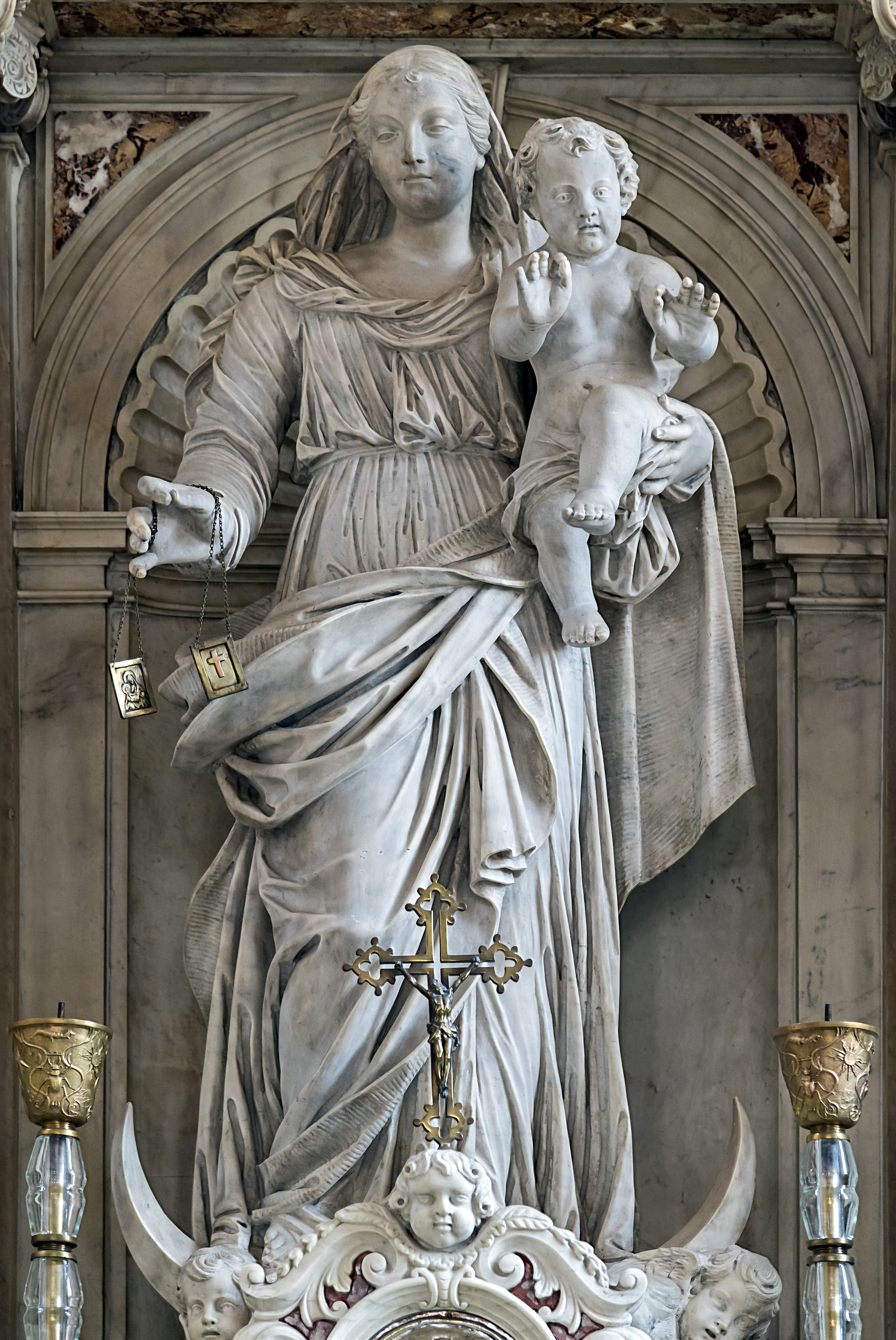
Madonna del carmelo by Bernardo Falconi
- Penance, humility, truth: Penance (dark-skinned woman holding a wooden cross in prayer); Humility (teenager dressed in white with a lamb treading sceptres and wreaths); The Truth (woman turned back holding a sieve).
- Theological virtues of Faith, Hope, Charity: Faith (woman dressed in white, holding a cross and a chalice), Hope (Woman in a green coat holding an anchor), Charity (Mother with two child with a flame above of the head).
- Angel with lilies and putto with scapulars: A putto brandied two scapulars, an angel in the center holds a bouquet of lilies (symbol of chastity), two seraphim below kiss.
- The Virgin in glory hands Saint Simon Stock the scapular: This was the last central picture to have been put in place in 1749.
- Courage and Justice: Courage (woman leaning against a column with a lion); Justice (woman crowned with thorn a sword in hand, surmounted by a dove).
- Prudence, purity and temperance: Prudence (woman with a snake wrapped around her arm and a mirror in her hand, eyes raised); Purity (young girl with raised hair, eyelids lowered); Temperance (woman pouring the liquid drawn at the source).

Bordering on both sides the central table.

- An angel who saves a boy who falls from a scaffolding
- An angel dressed in red offers the scapular to the faithful

At the top and bottom of the central table

- Angel with lilies and putto with scapulars: A putto brandied two scapulars, an angel in the center holds a bouquet of lilies (symbol of chastity), two seraphim below kiss.
- The angel of indulgences
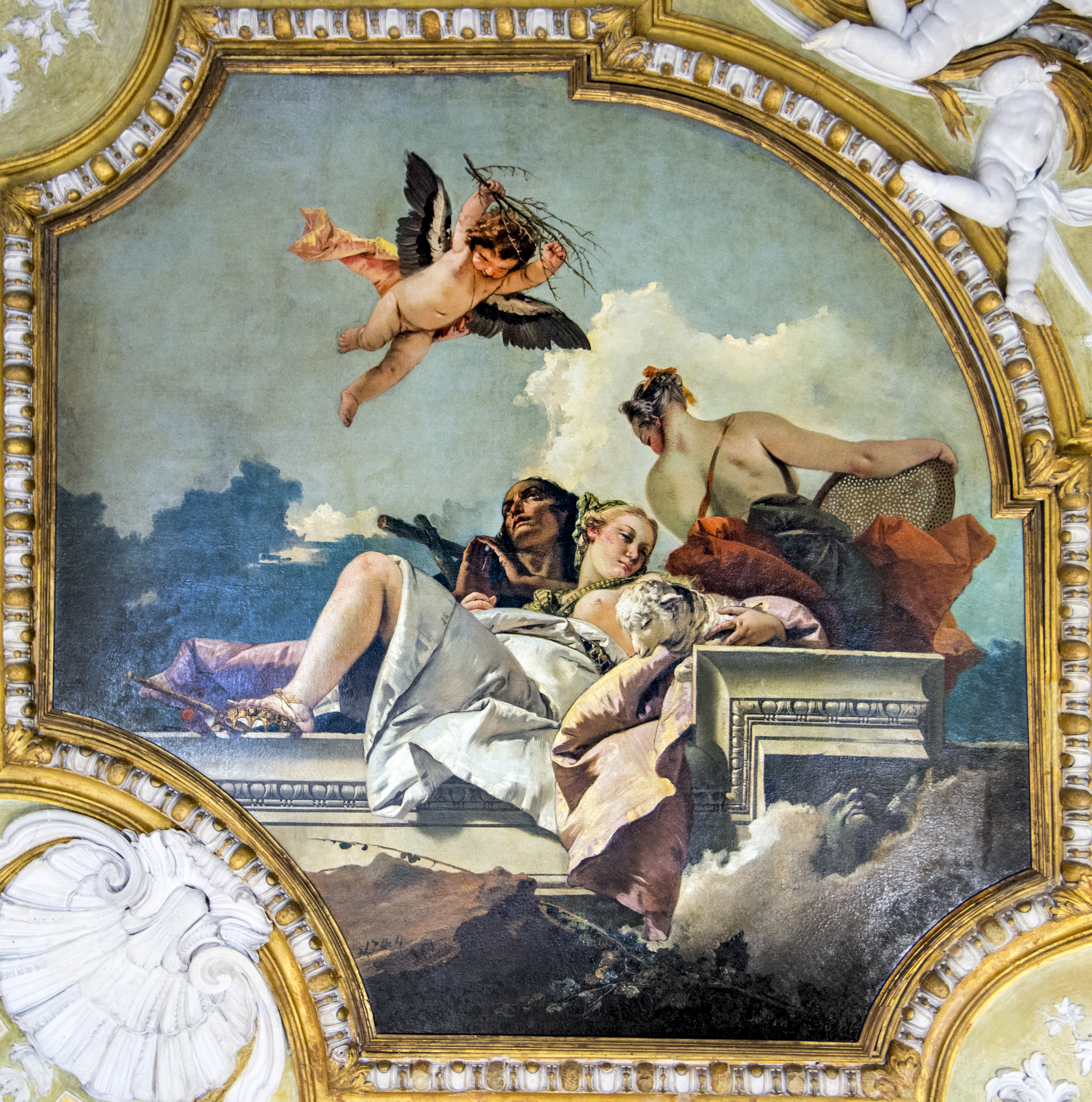
Penance, humility, truth

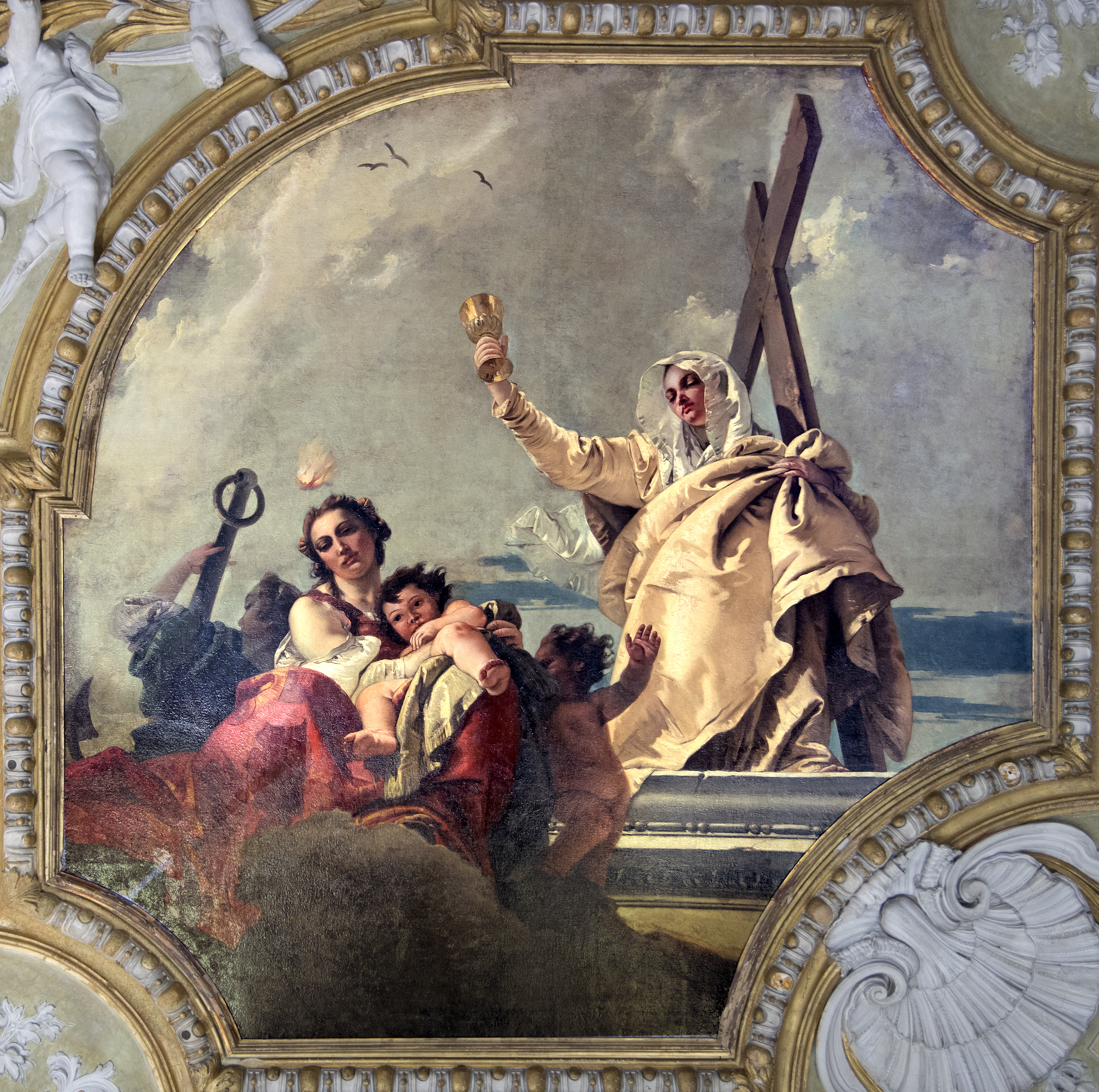
Theological virtues; Faith, Hope, Charity

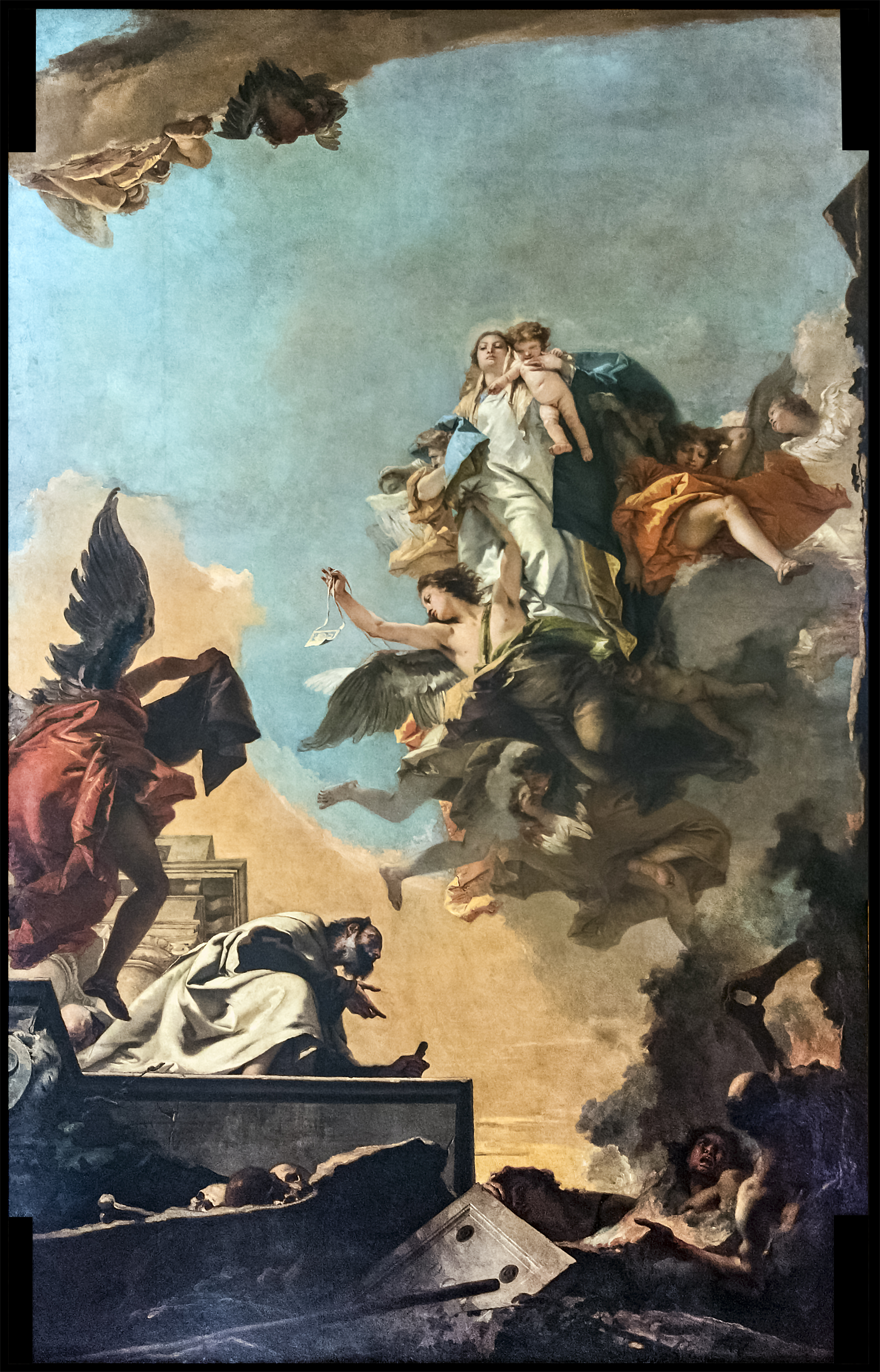
The Virgin in glory hands Saint Simon Stock the scapular

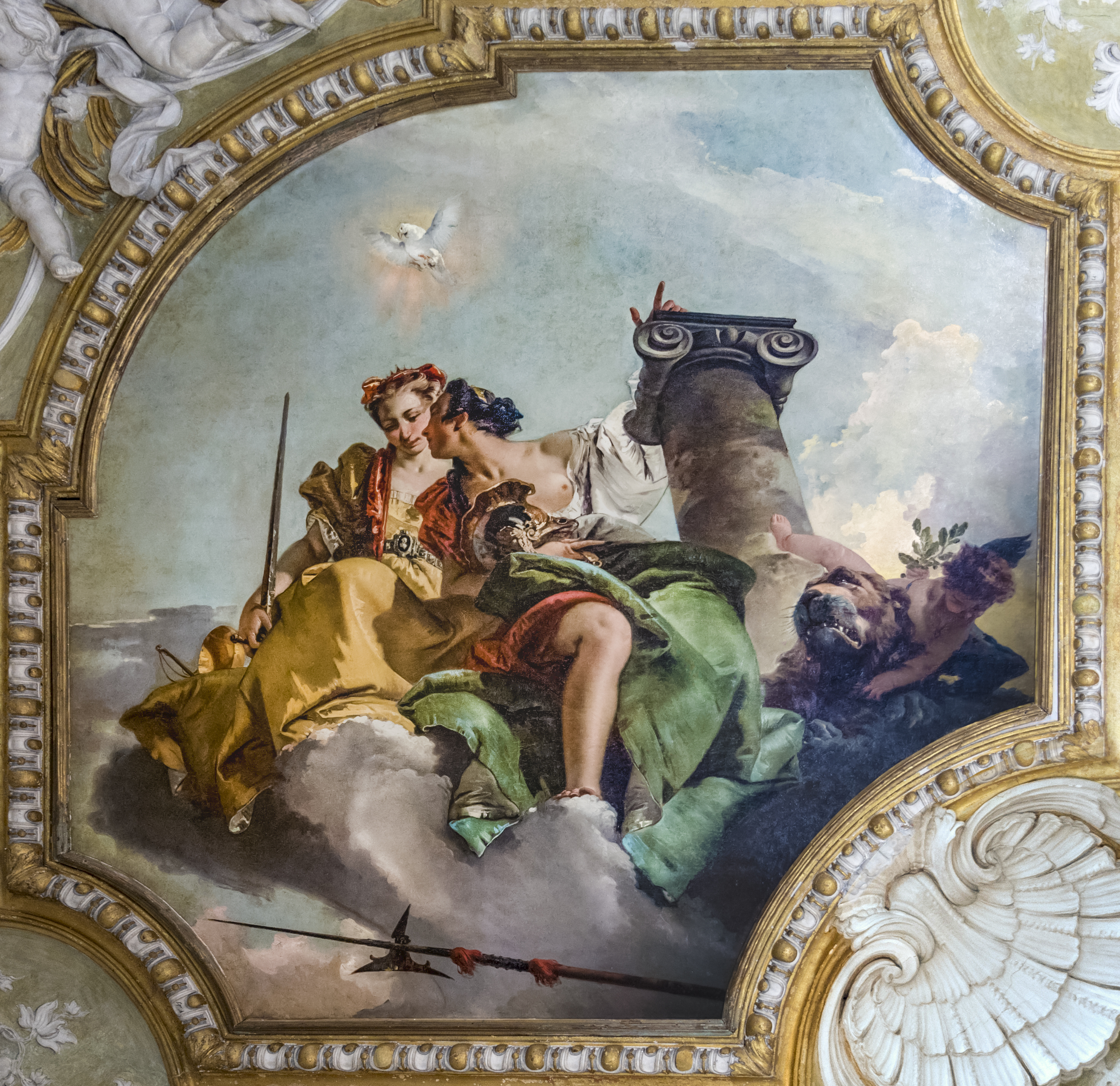
Courage and Justice

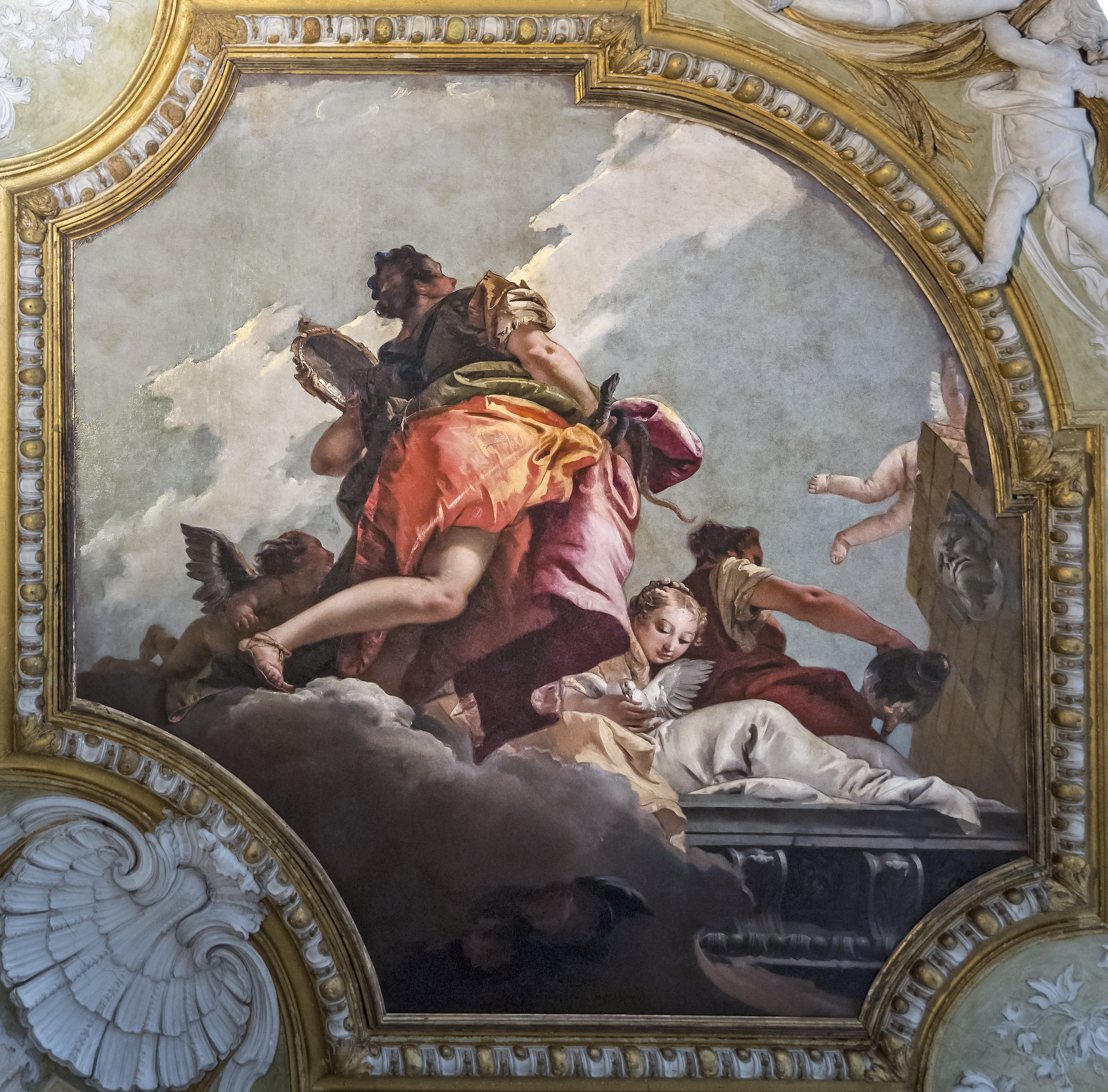
Prudence, purity and temperance

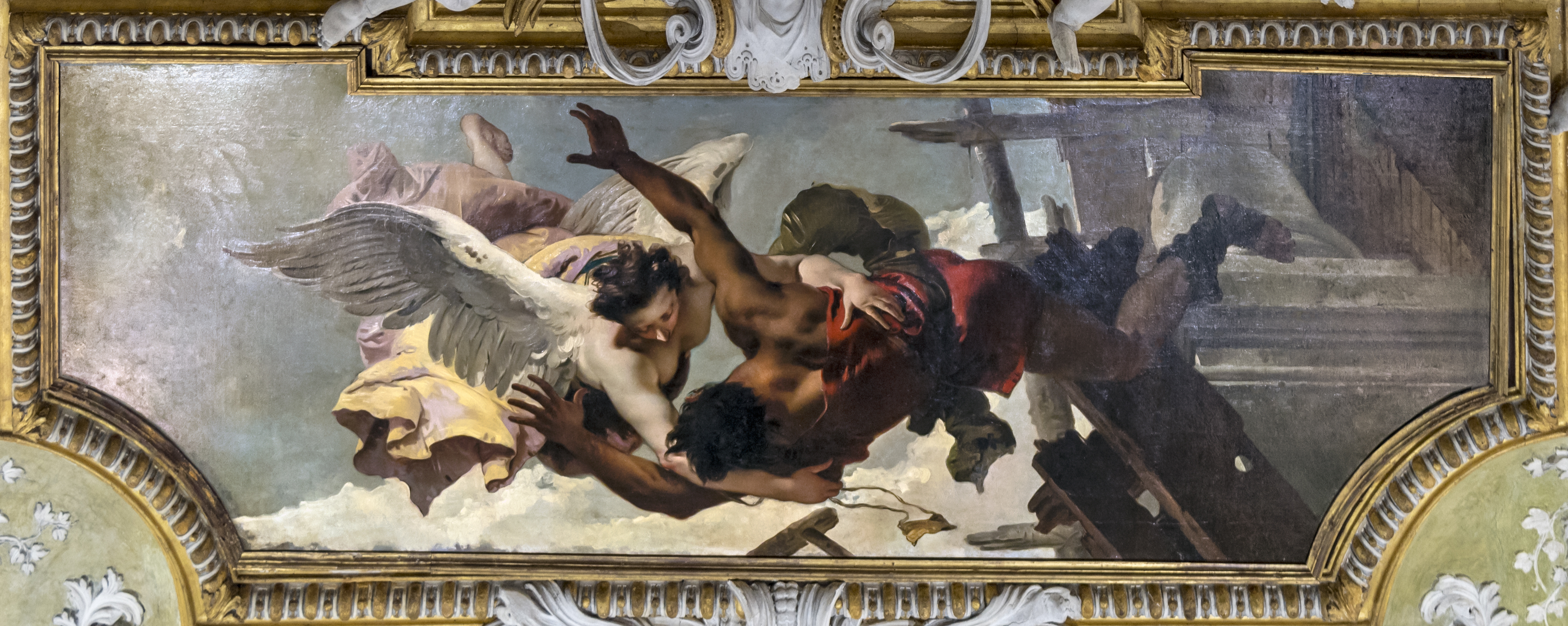
The angel who saves a boy who falls from a scaffolding

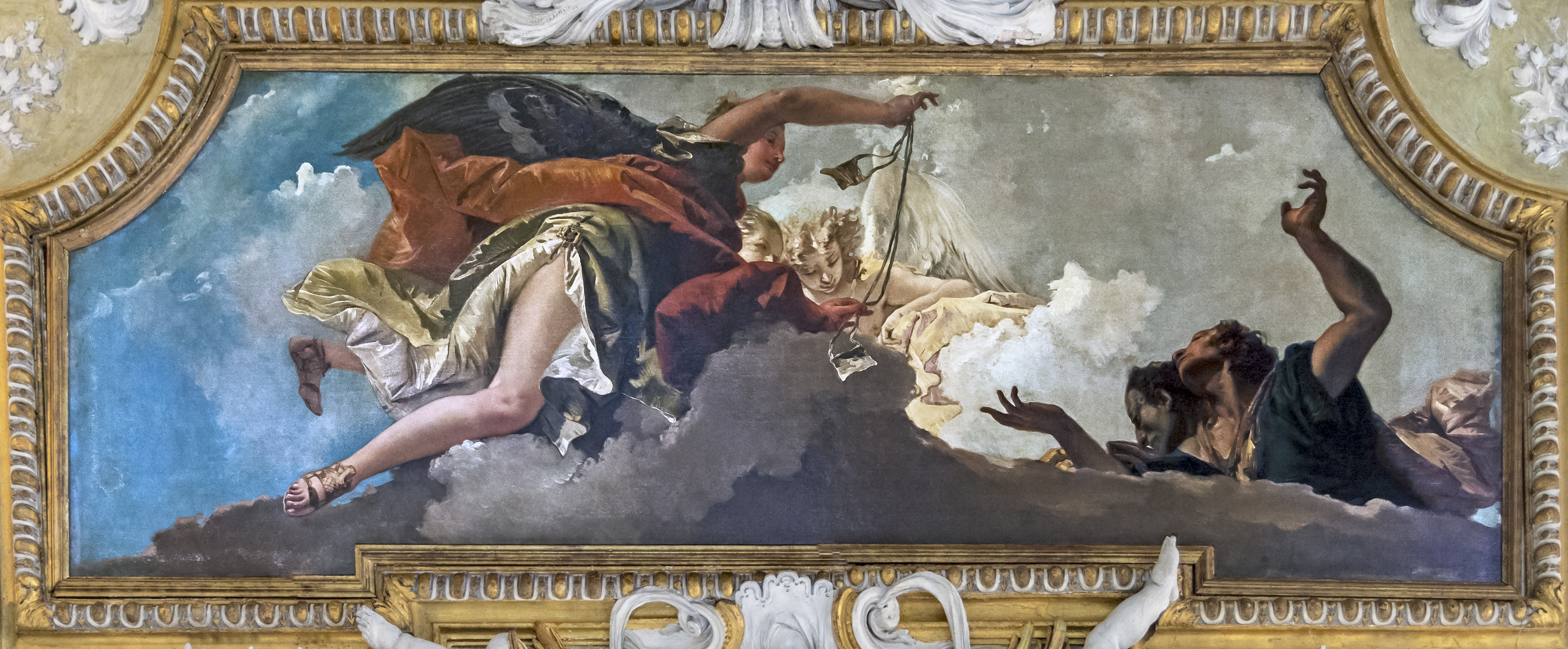
The angel dressed in red wears the scapular for the faithful

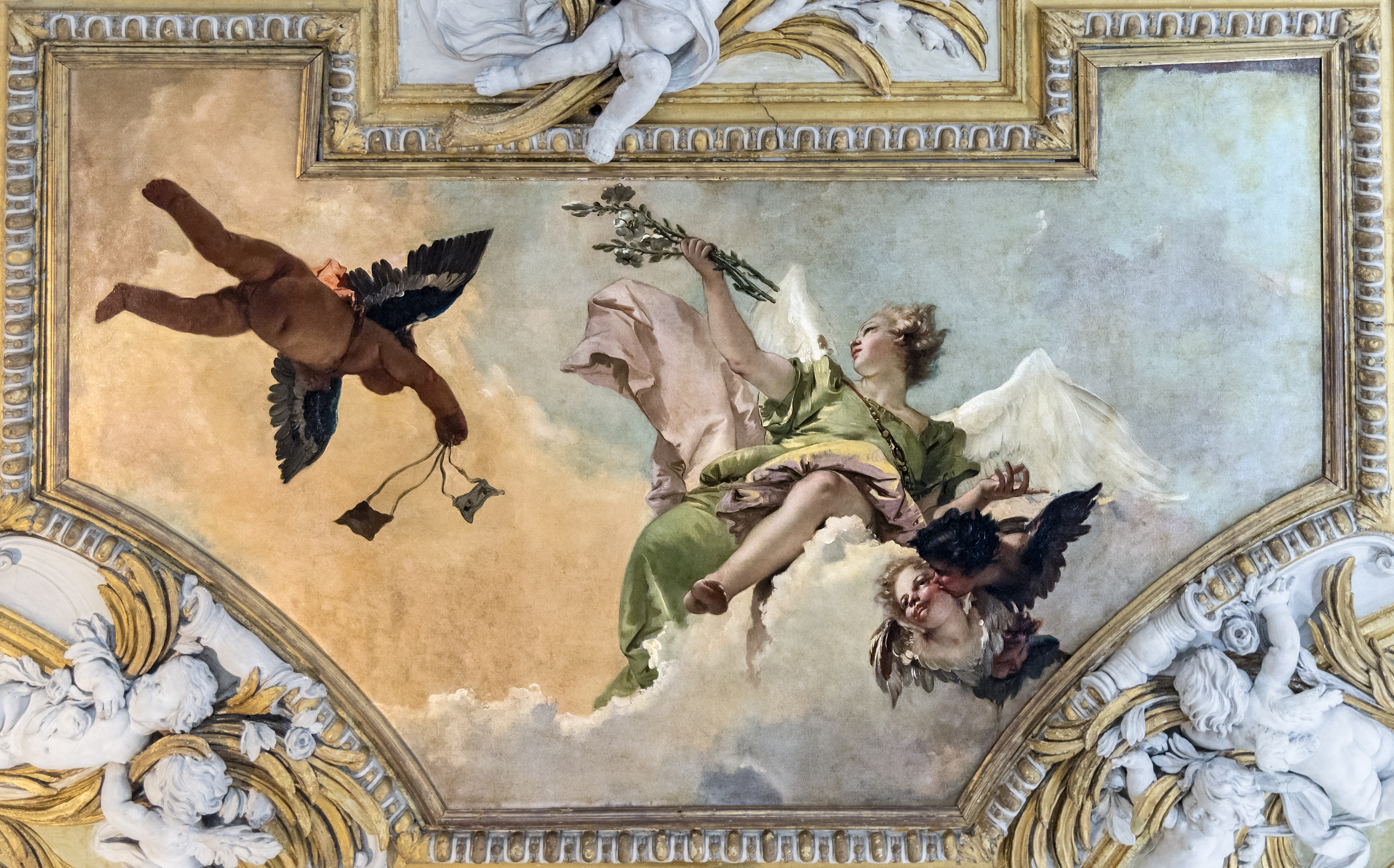
Angel with lilies and putto with scapulars

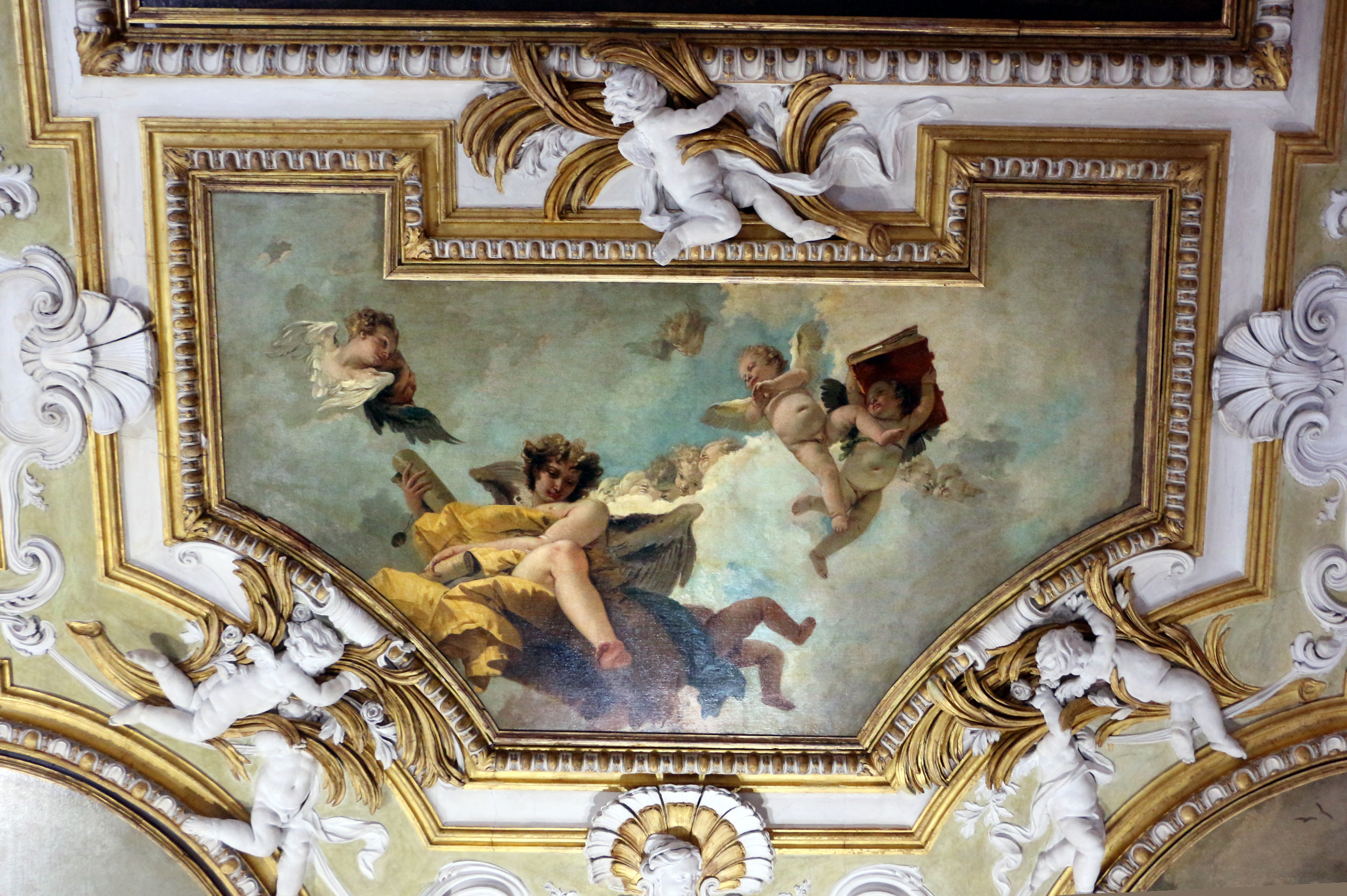
The angel of indulgences

The walls
The wall opposite the altar shows two paintings of the painter Amedeo Enz set up in 1679: The Pope Paul V receives the Spanish Ambassador and The Pope John XXII receive the scapular
The wall opposite the entrance: Three miracles attributed to Our Lady of the Word Carmel by Antonio Zanchi; The miracle of the well, a girl is saved after spending eight days in a well; The wound of the Prince of Salmone , the prince wounded in the thigh in a tournament is miraculously healed.
The wall of the grand staircase: two paintings by Gregorio Lazzarini Angels invite the banks to worship the child Jesus, and The Adoration of the Magi of 1704. A painting by Sante Piatti of 1733 The Glory of the Angels .

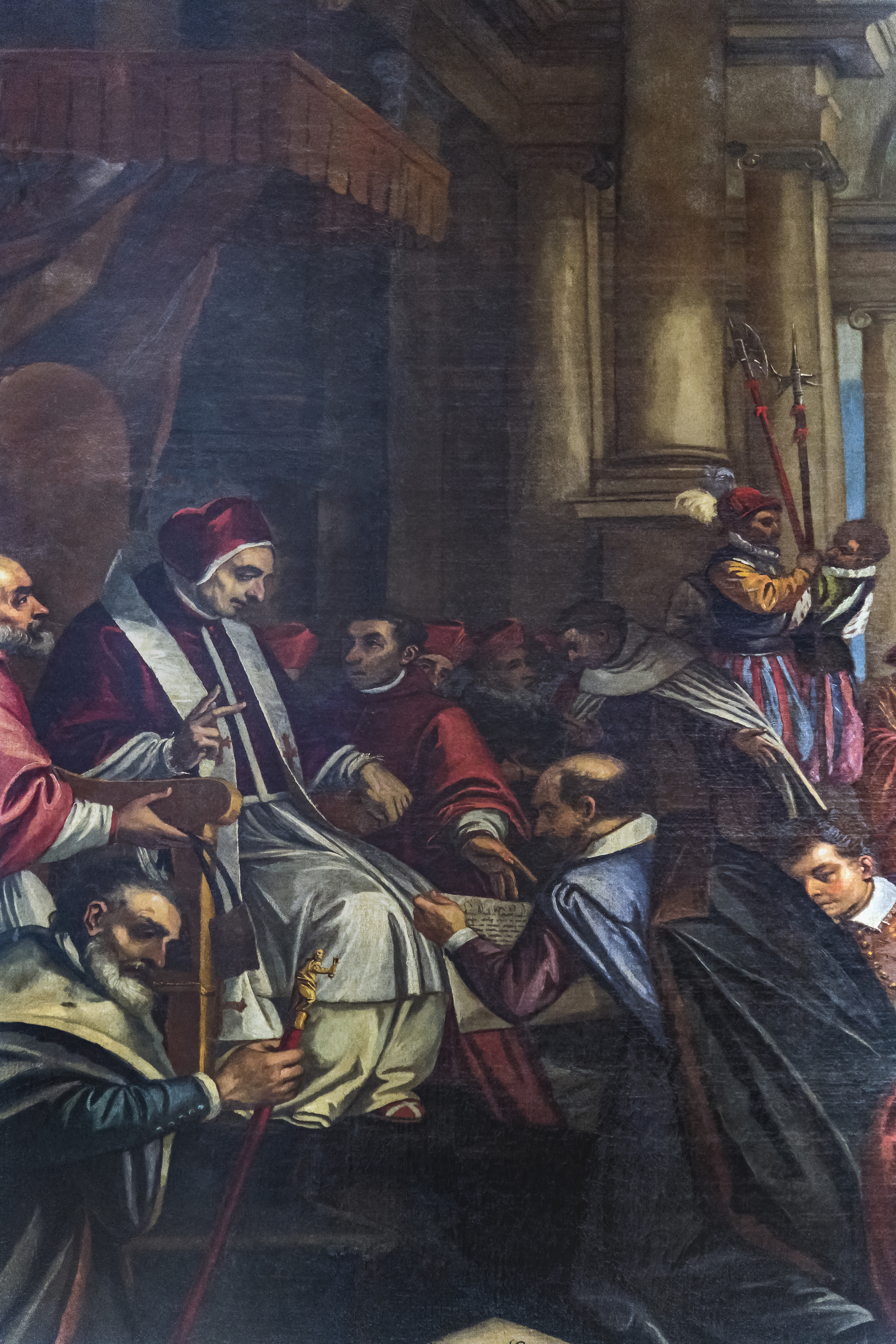
The Pope Paul V receives the Spanish Ambassador

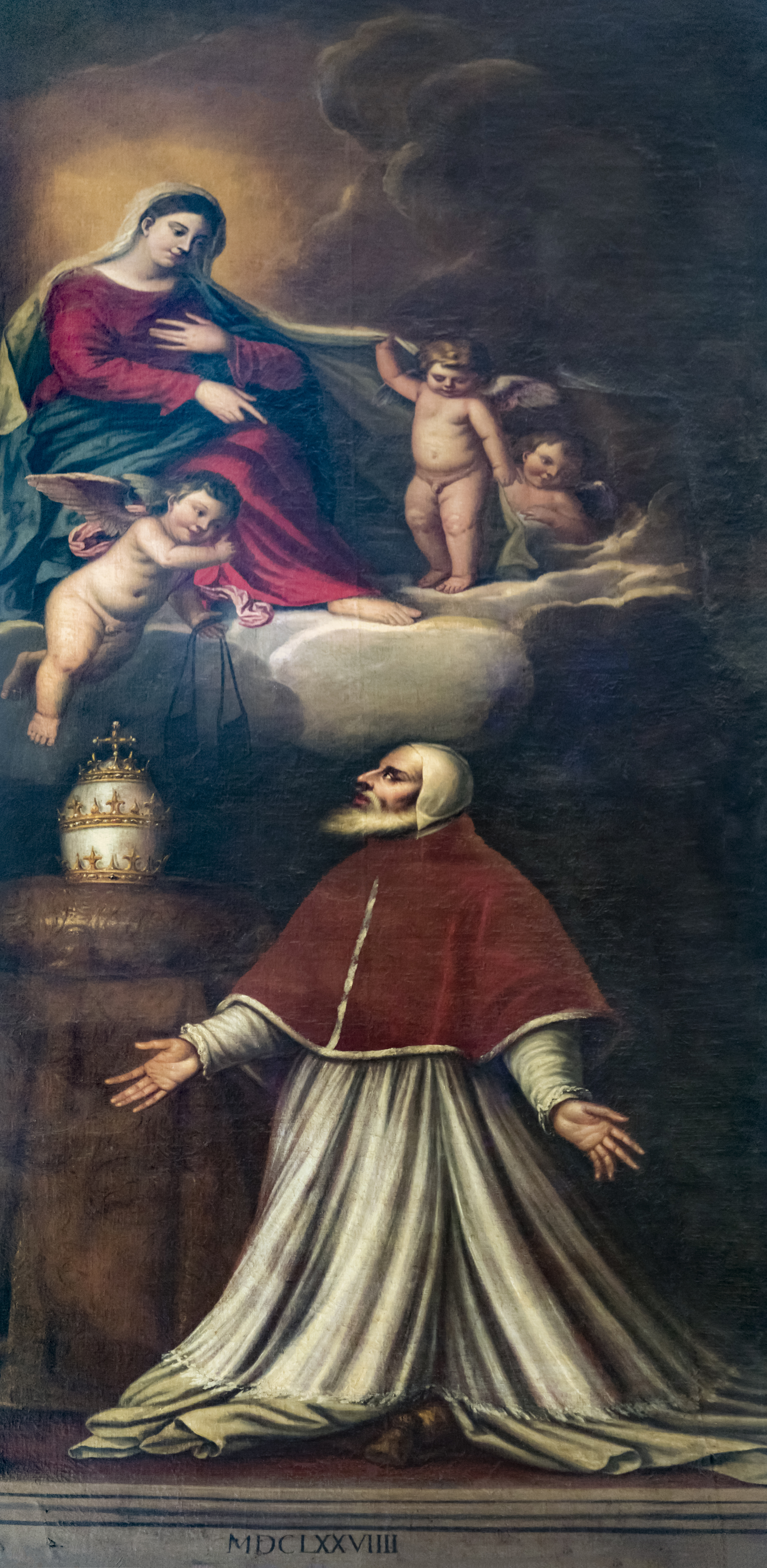
The Pope John XXII receives the scapular

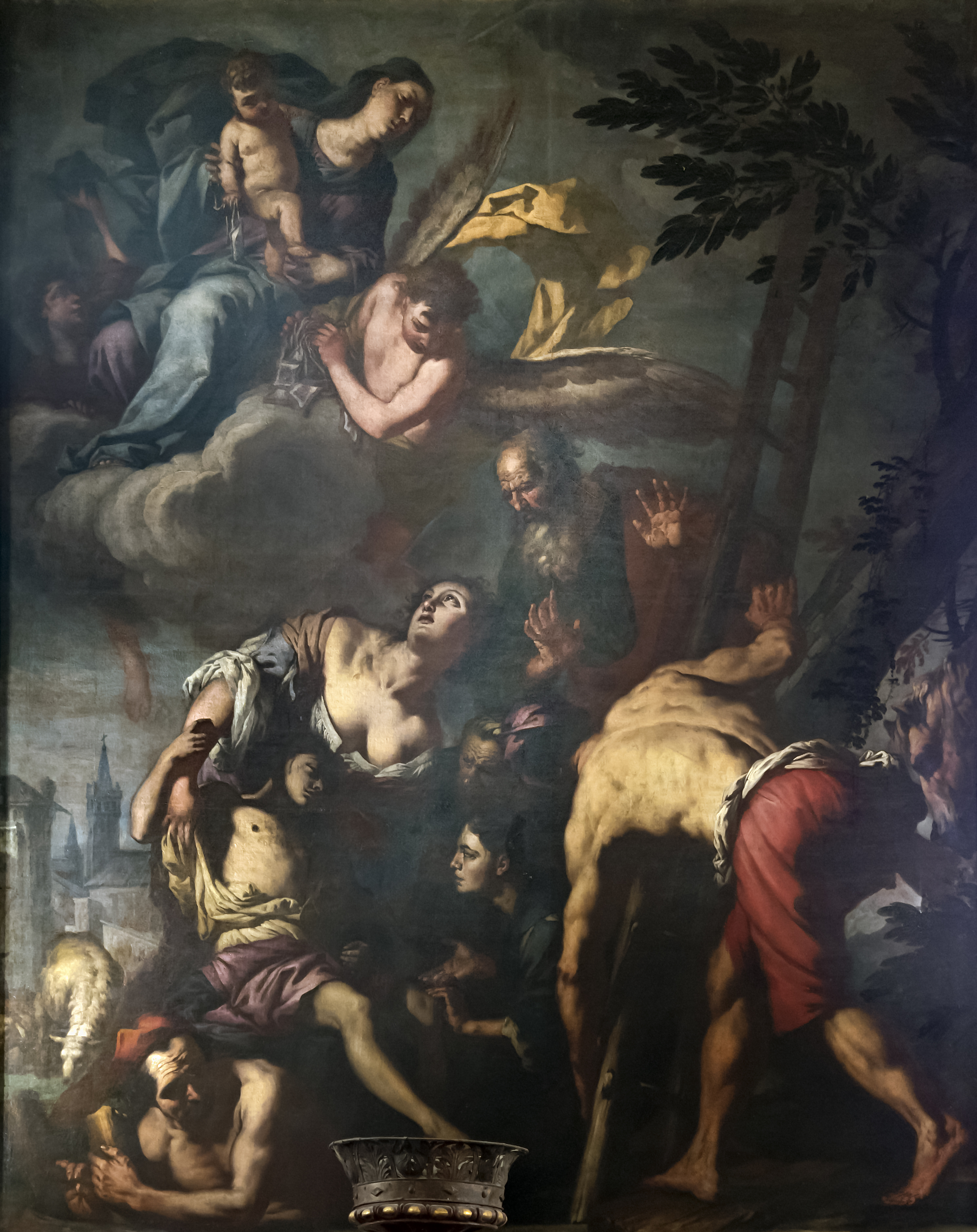
The miracle of the well by Antonio Zanchi

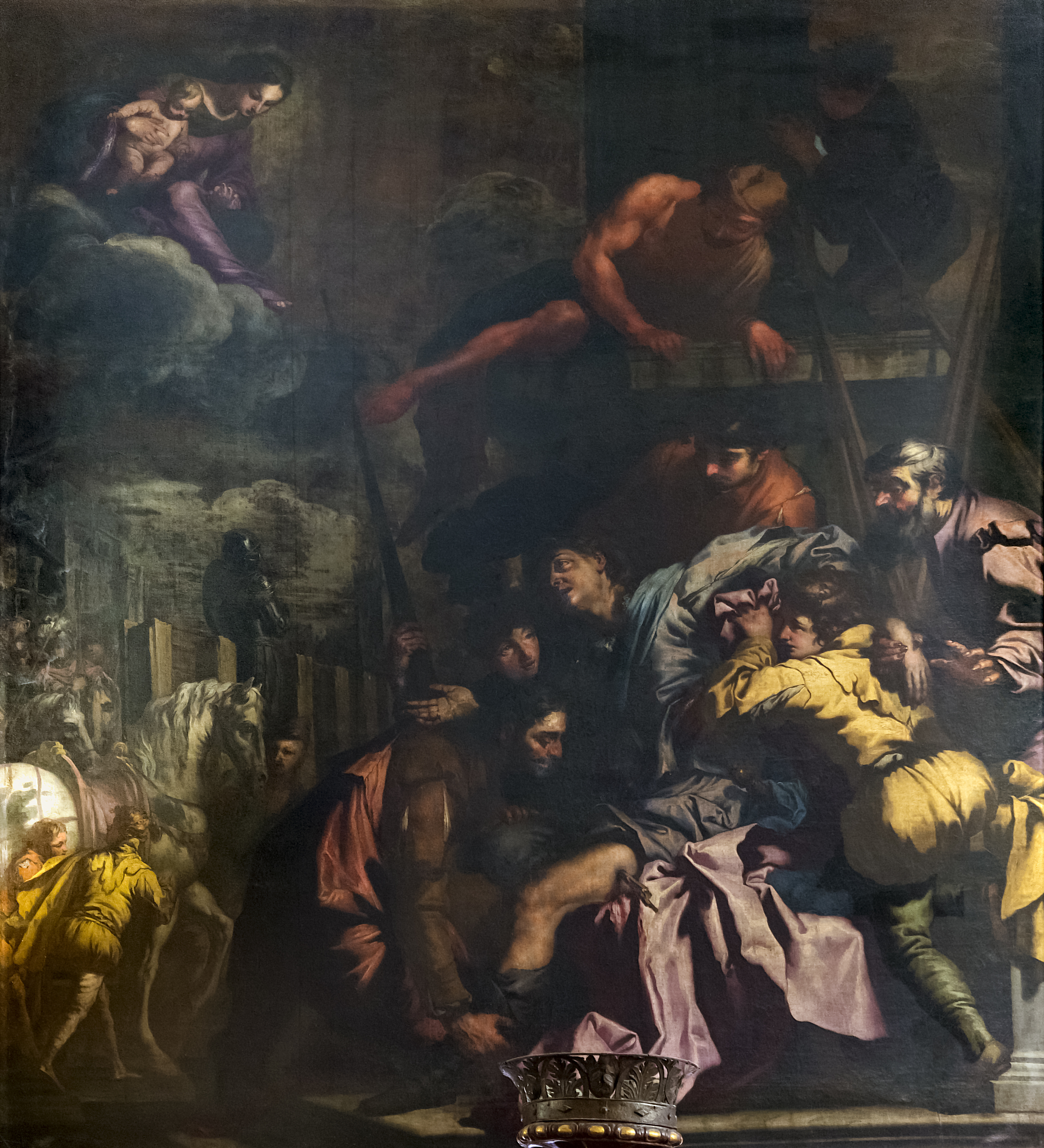
The wound of the prince of Sulmona by Antonio Zanchi

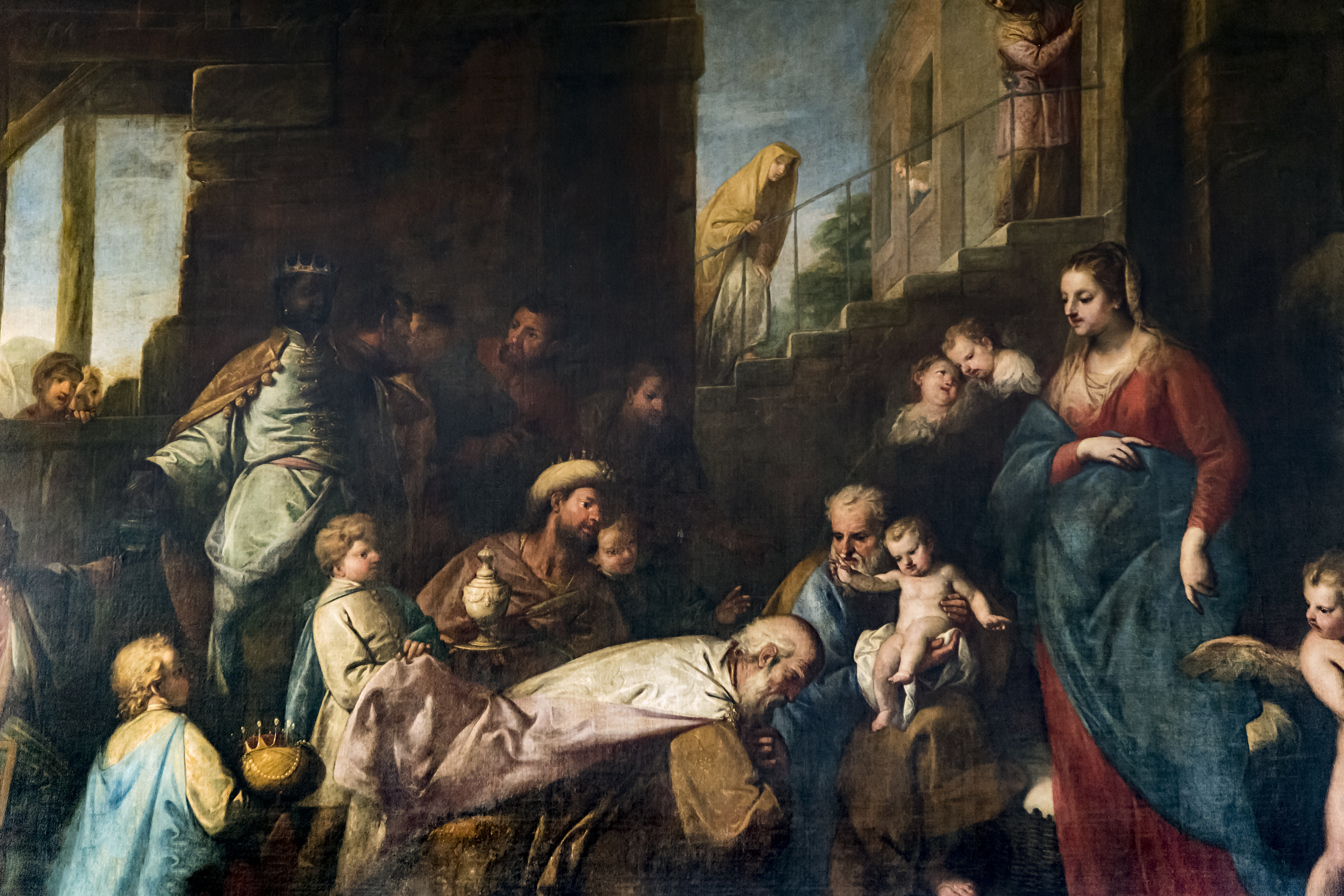
The Adoration of the Magi by Gregorio Lazzarini

=== Sala dell'Albergo ===
So called because we welcomed pilgrims and the poor. Nowadays, it is reserved for meetings of the Chancellery and members of Scuola. The wall coverings are carved walnut and the pavement is made of polychrome marbles.

The ceiling
The wooden ceiling was decorated by Francesco Lucchini and Alessandro Orlandi in 1740. In the center the 'Assumption' by Alessandro Varotari says the Padovanino (1588- 1648). This oil on canvas work was originally in the chapter house and was moved to make room for Tiepolo's paintings. All around the paintings of Giustino Menescardi after a drawing by Gaetono Zompini.

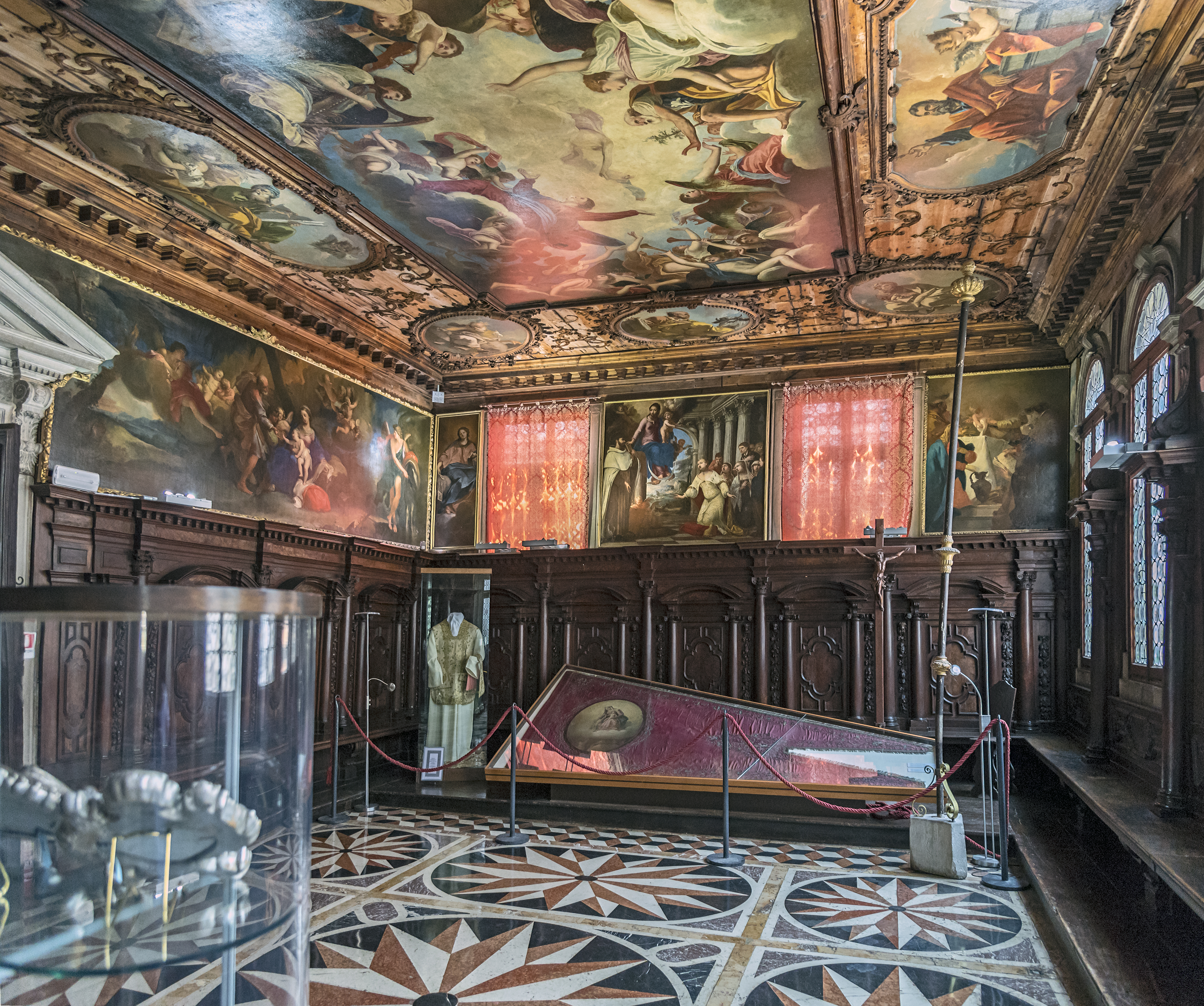
Sala dell'Albergo

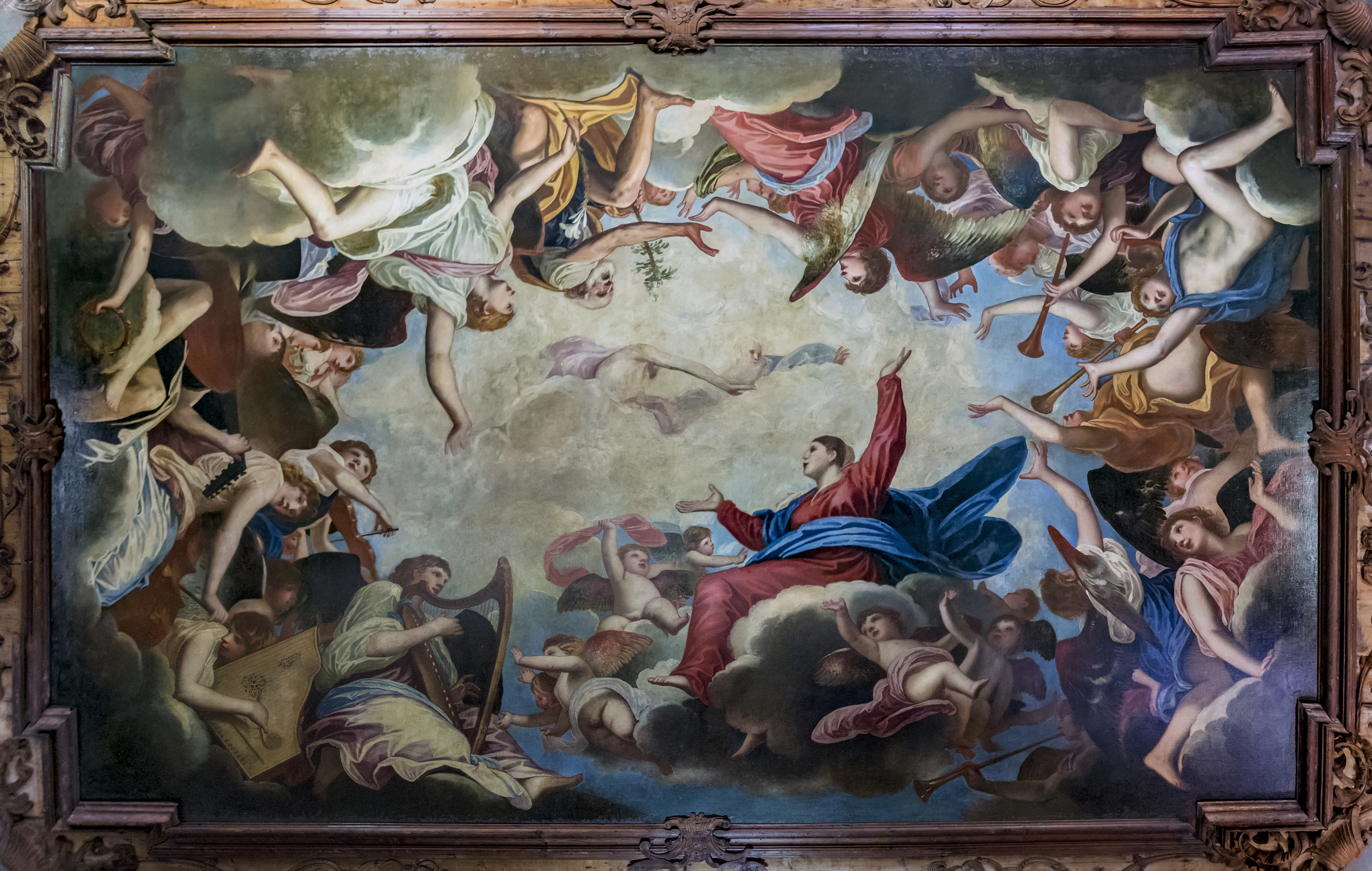
Assumption by Alessandro Varotari

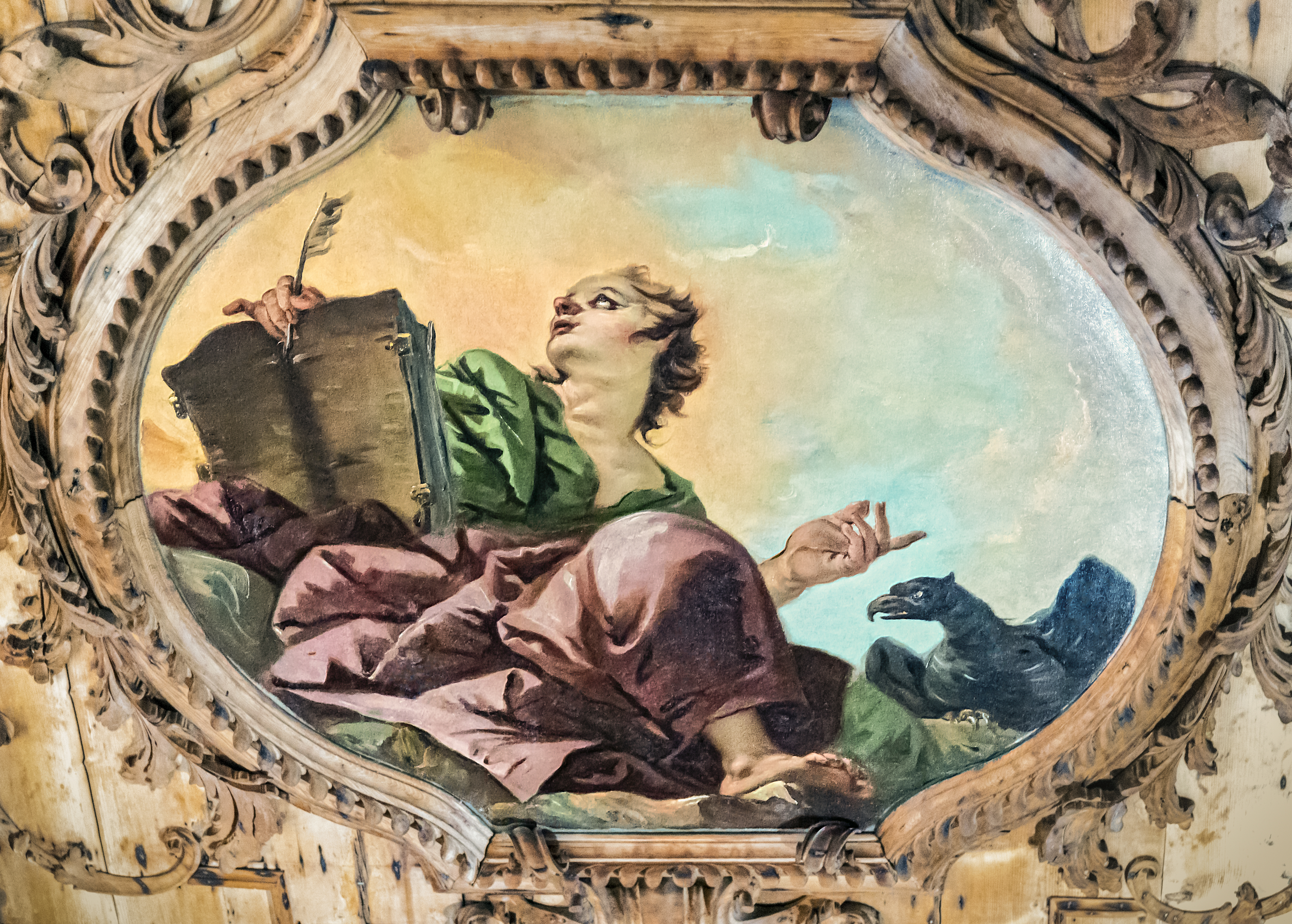
St. John by Giustino Menescardi

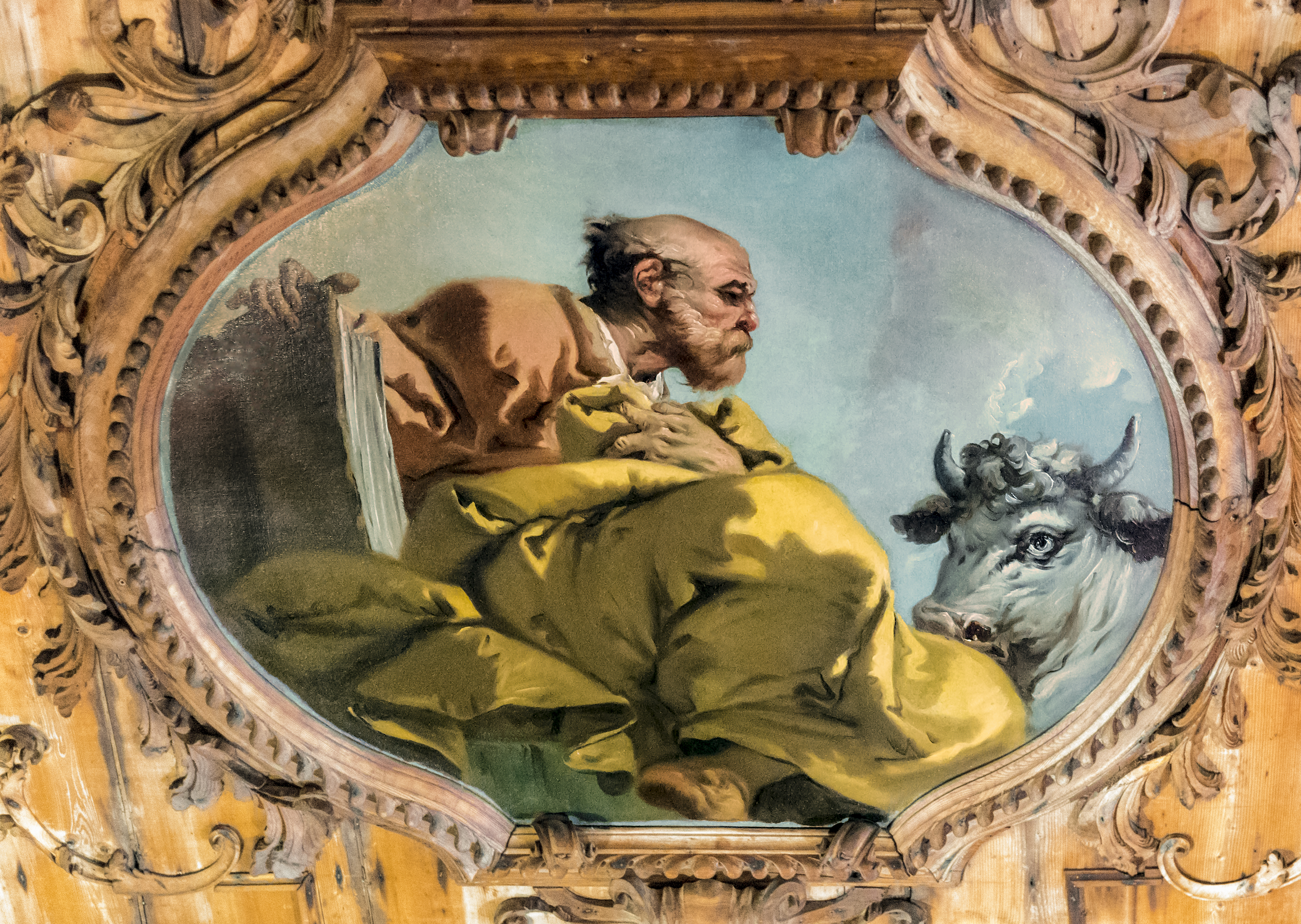
St. Luke by Giustino Menescardi

The walls
On the wall between the two windows, two canvases by Giustino Menescardi: "The Madonna with scapulars" and "The allegory of Venice in Doge's clothes kneeling before the Virgin".
On the wall adjacent to the chapter room: The Dream of Joseph and The Rest of the Holy Family in Egypt by Antonio Balestra.
On the wall adjacent to the archives: The Virgin gives the scapular to Saint Albert of Sicily by an anonymous author of the 17th century and Adoration of the shepherds by Ambrogio Bon (1697).

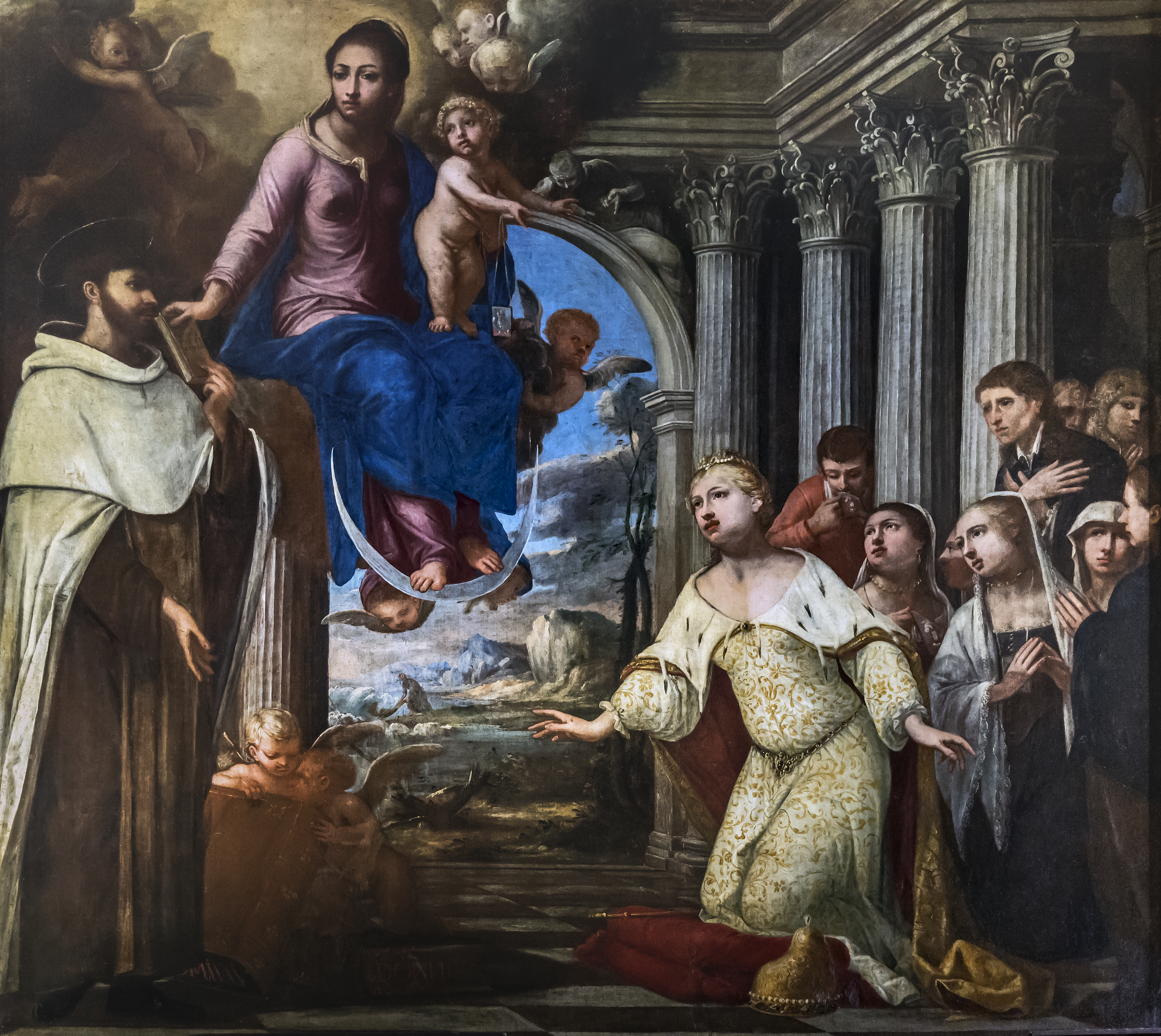
The allegory of Venice in Doge's clothes kneeling before the Virgin

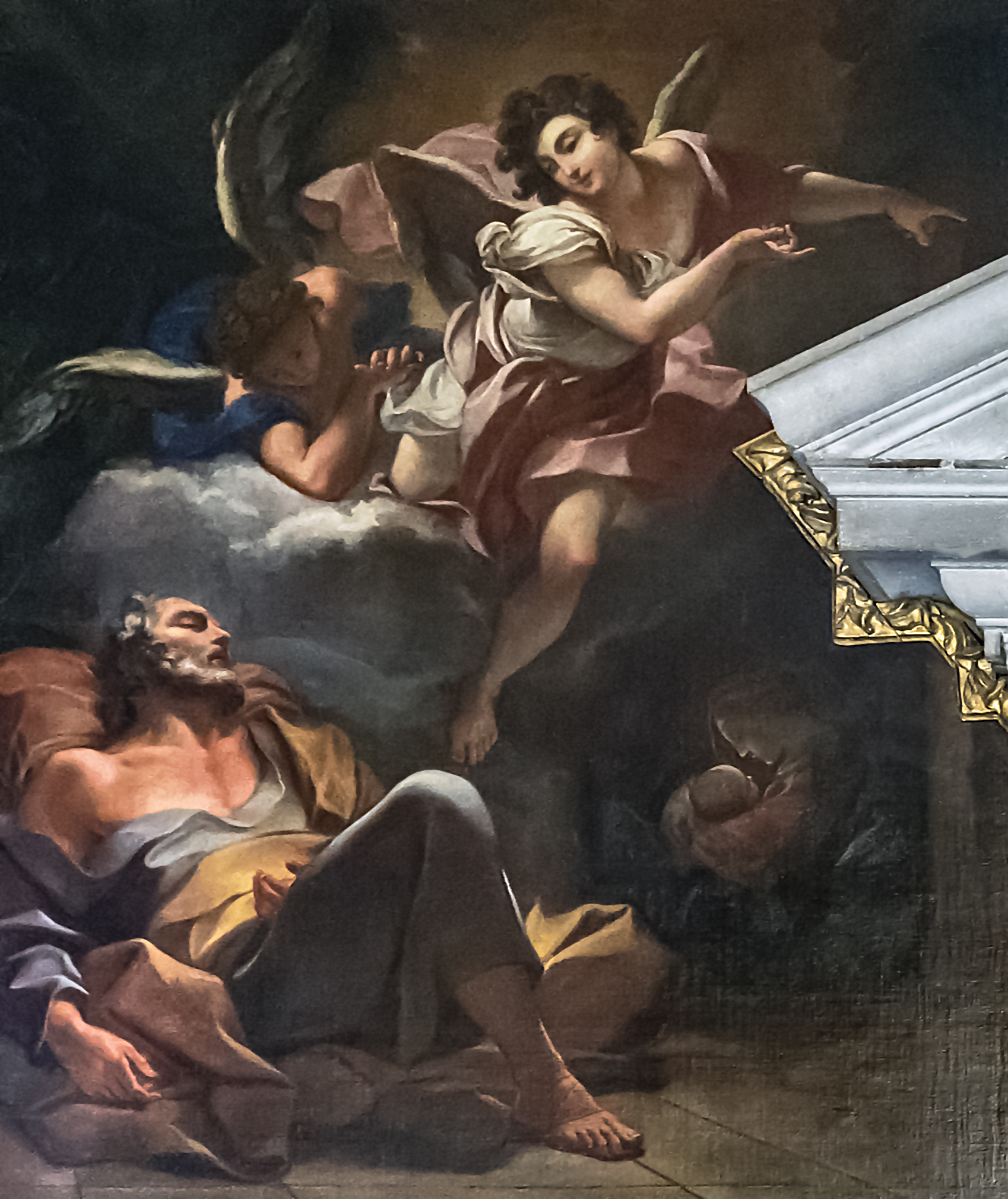
The Dream of Joseph by Antonio Balestra

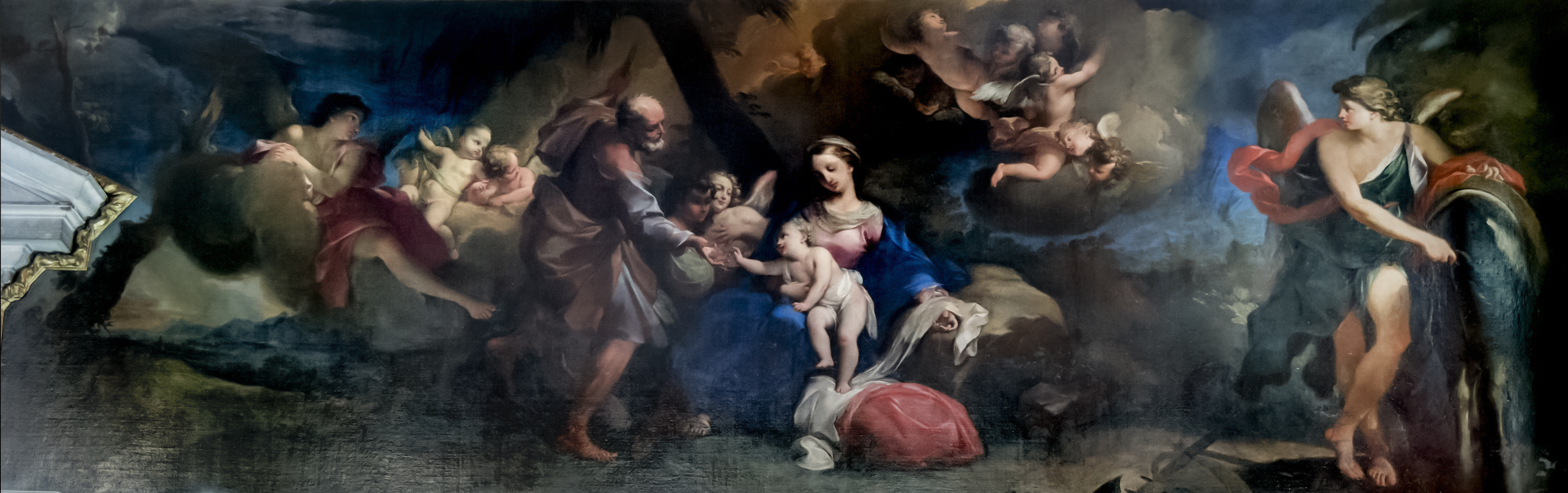
The rest of the Holy Family in Egypt by Antonio Balestra

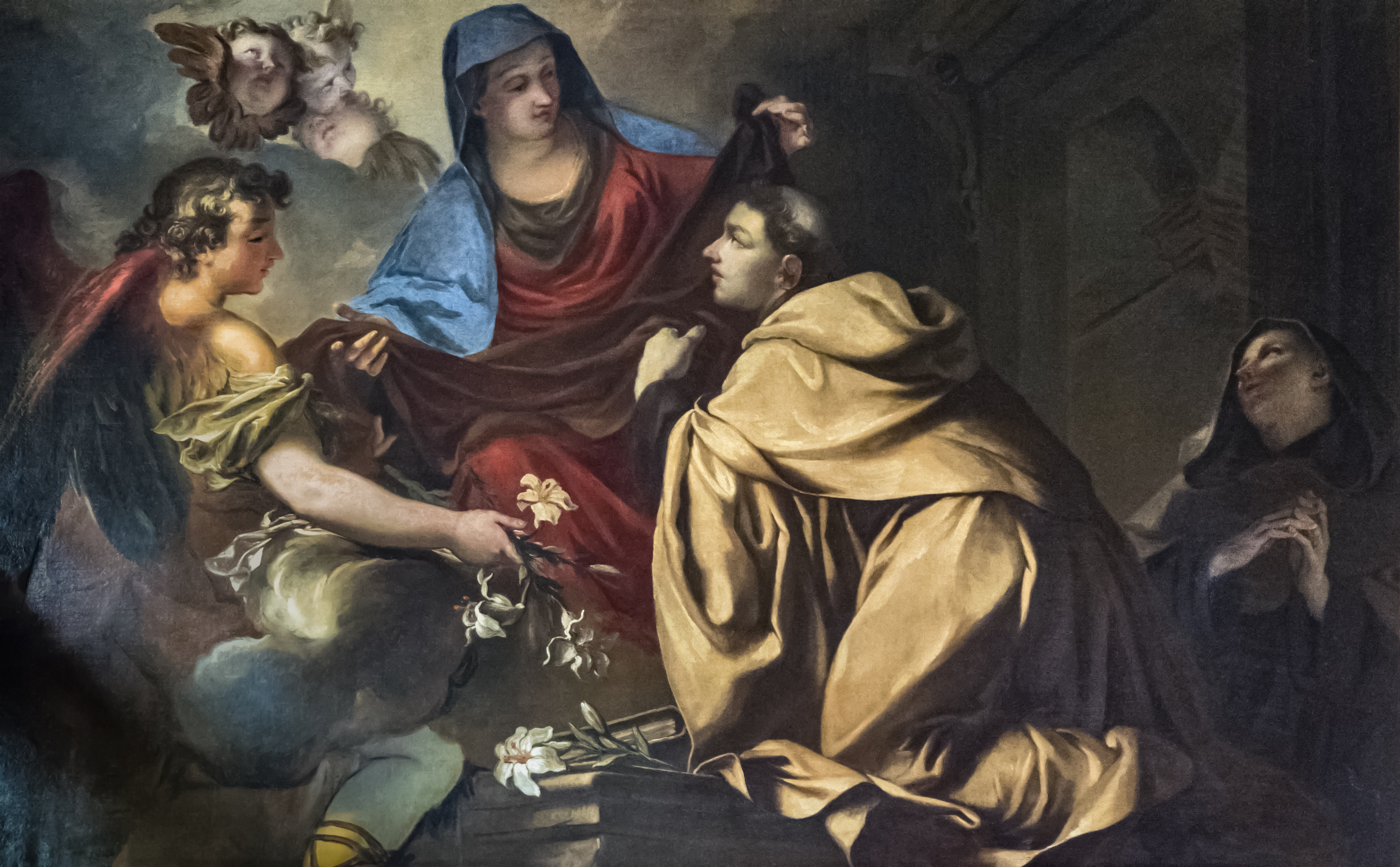

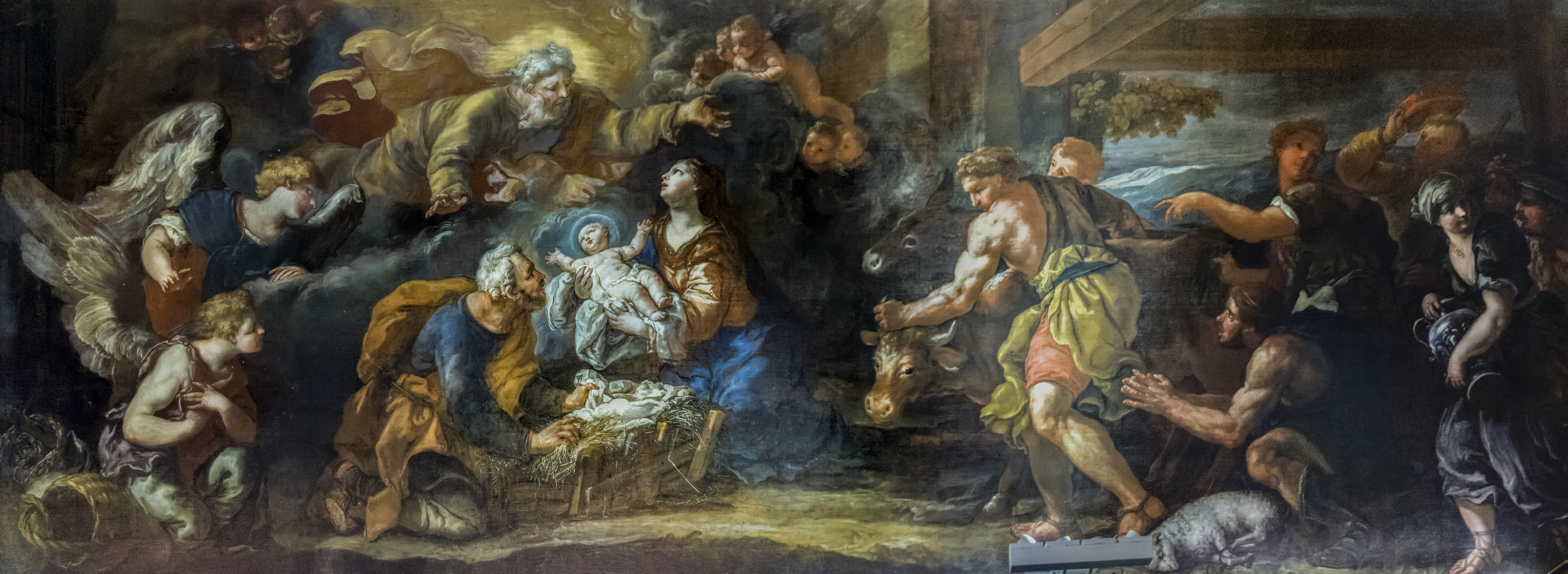
Adoration of the shepherds by Ambrogio Bon

=== The rooms of the archive ===
The rooms of the archive contain ceiling and wall paintings by Giustino Menescardi with elaborate woodwork, specially caryatids by Giacomo Piazzetta father of the painter Giovanni Battista Piazzetta.; the iconography of the paintings was organized by Gaetano Zompini. Among Menescardi's paintings are Martyrdom of Brothers Maccabe and Abigail placates David's designs against her husband Nabal. The ceiling depicts a Virgin appears to Elias atop Mount Carmel.

In the antechamber a painting by Giovanni Battista Piazzetta Judithe and Holofernes from 1745. On the wall in front of the file cabinet is a large painting by Gaetano Zompini: Esther faints before Ahasuerus. On the wall facing the windows a two-part paintings by Giustino Menescardi: The Martyrdom of the Maccabees and St. Salome . On the wall of the cabinet of the Archives two paintings. Abigail soothes and disarms David indignant against his husband Nabal by Giustino Menescardi and Rebecca at the Well by Gaetano Zompini.

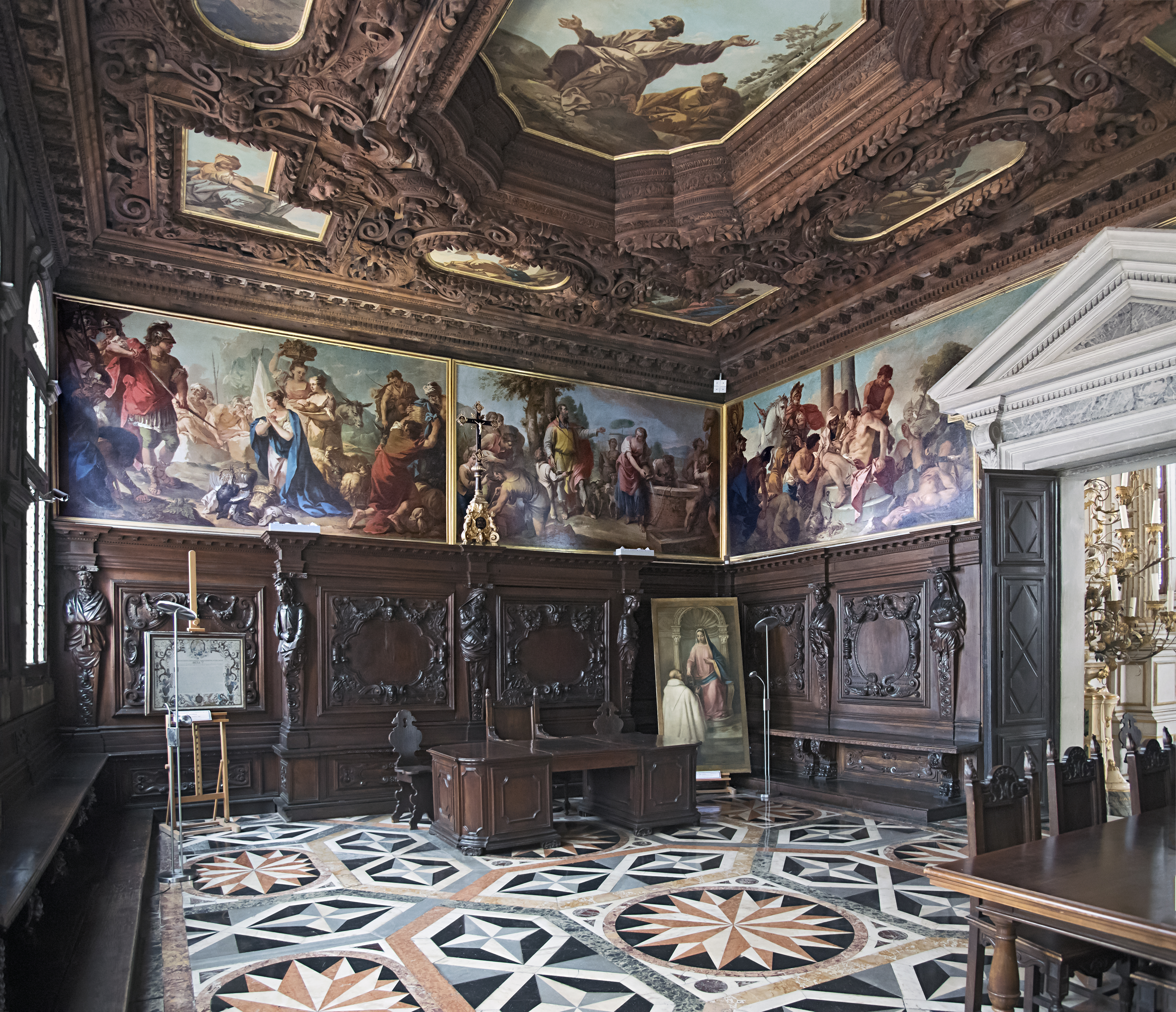
Rooms of the archive

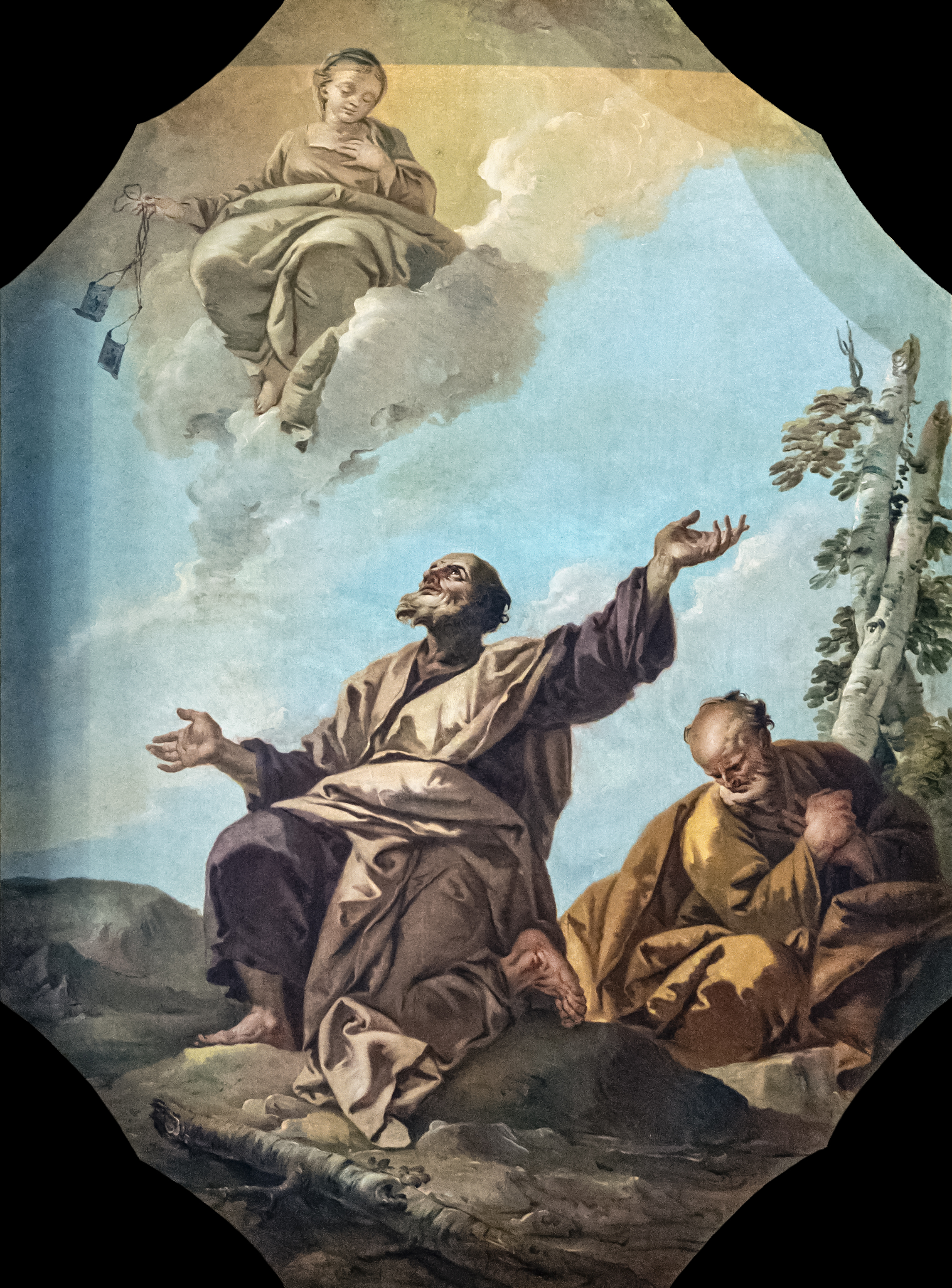
Virgin appears to Elias atop Mount Carmel Giustino Menescardi

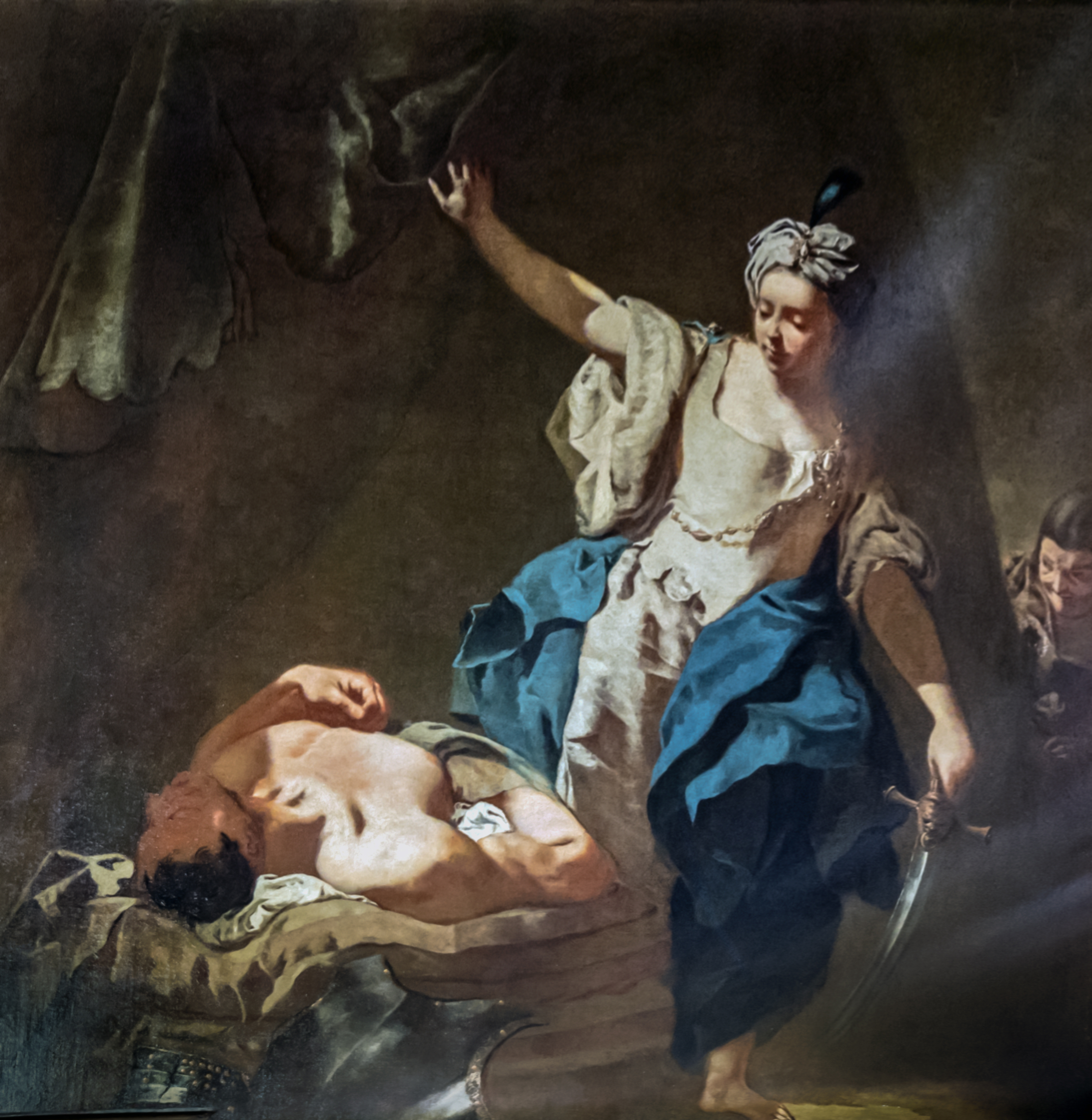
Judith and Holofernese by Giovanni Battista Piazzetta

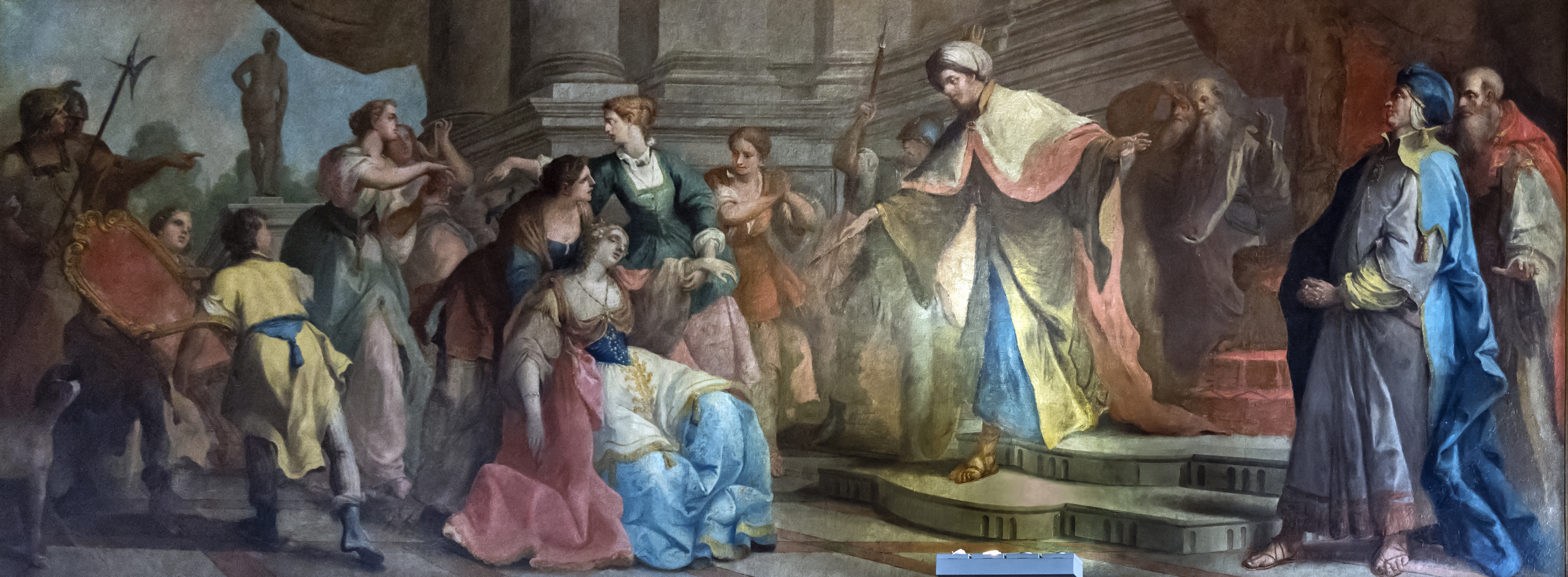
Ester faints before Ahasuerus by Gaetano Zompini

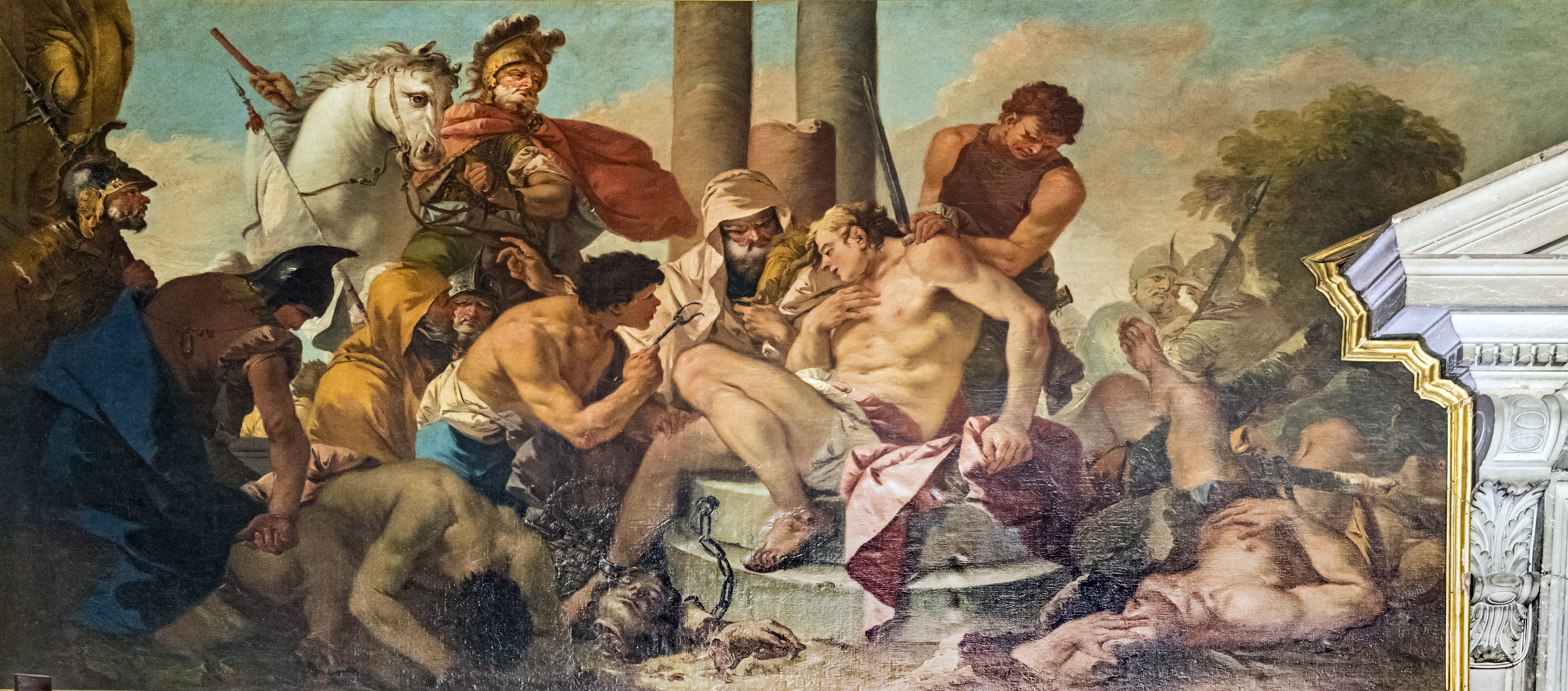
The Martyrdom of the MaccabeesGiustino Menescardi

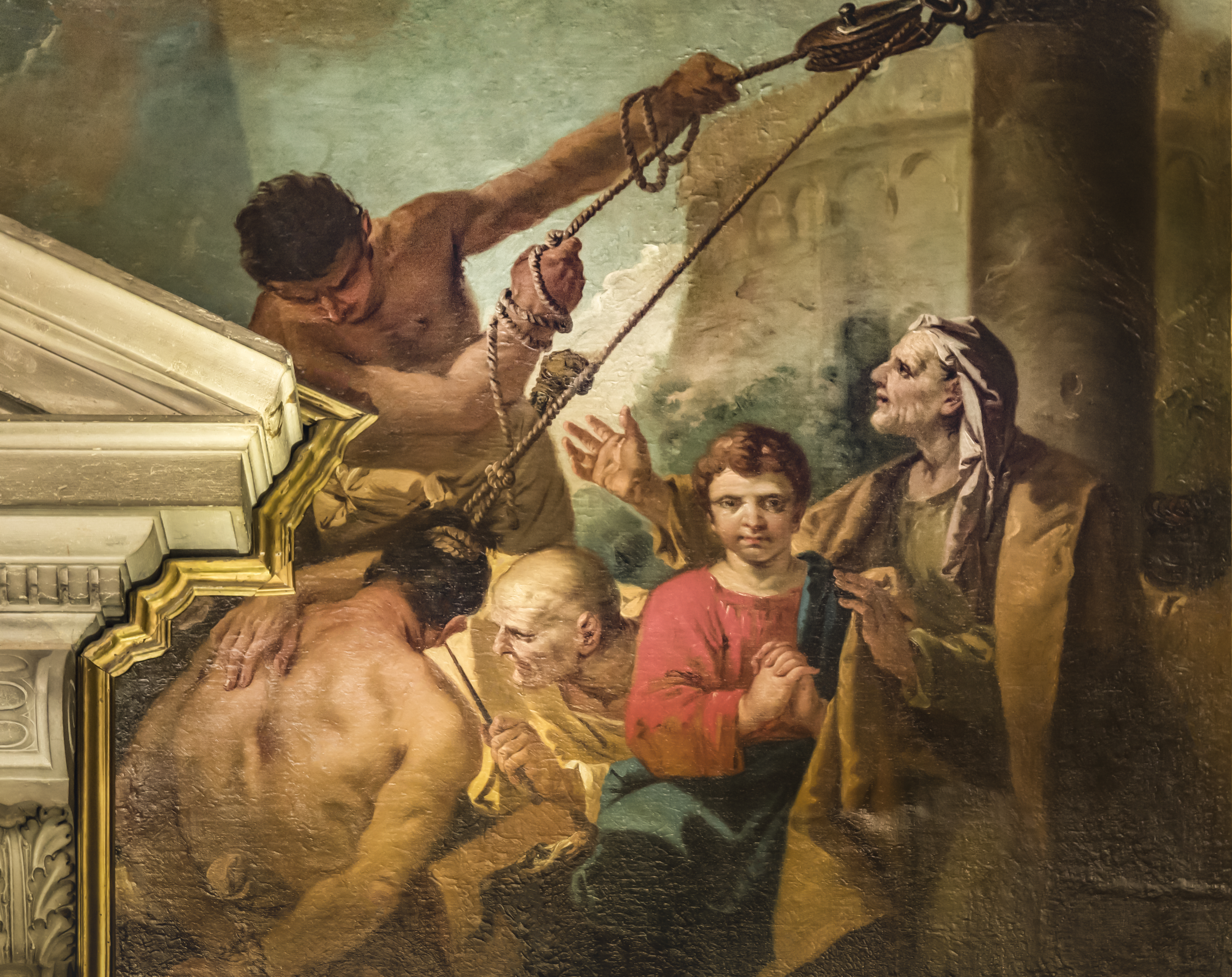
The Martyrdom of the Maccabees and St. Salome Giustino Menescardi

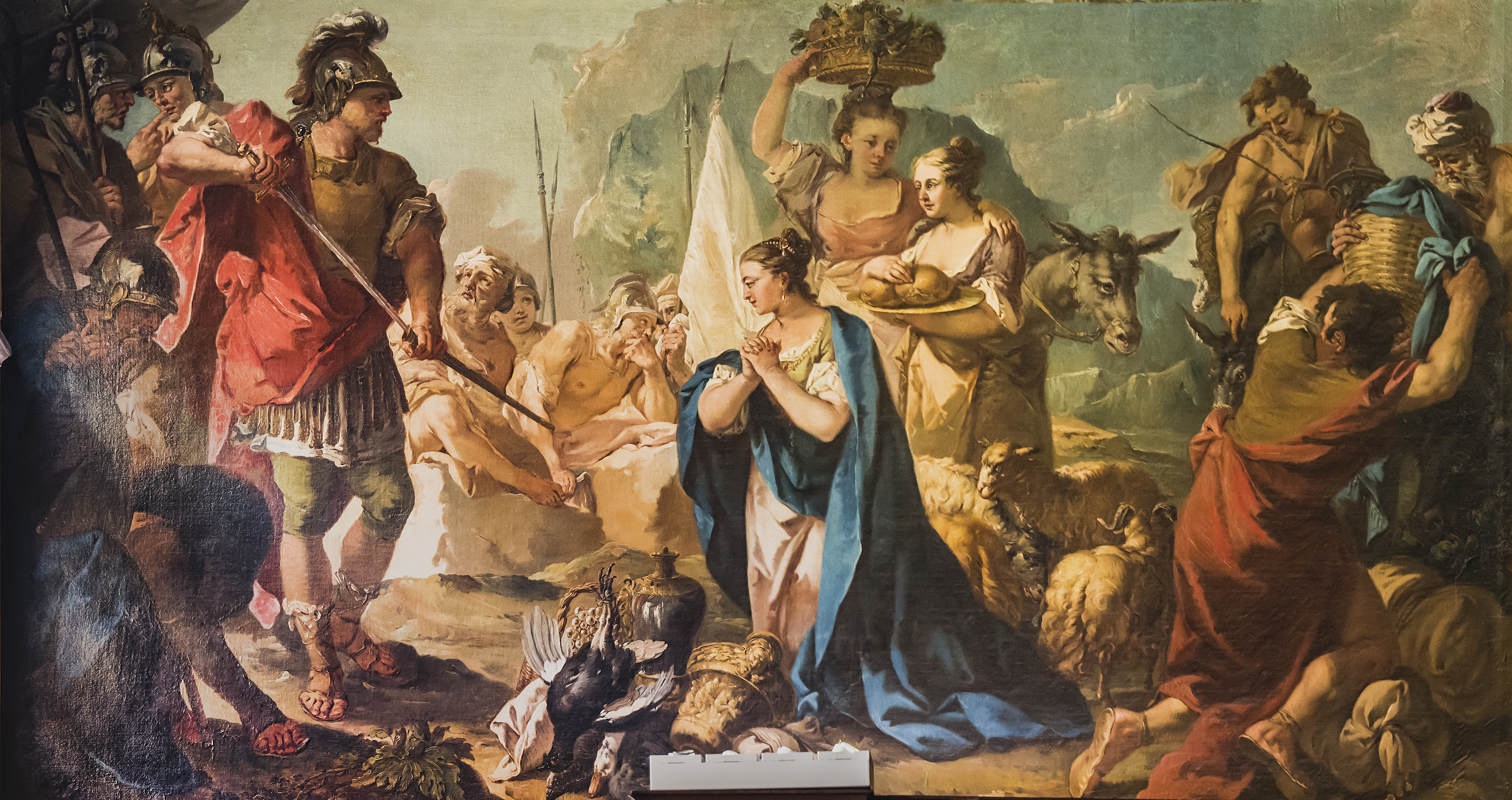
Abigail soothes and disarms David indignant against his husband Nabal by Giustino Menescardi Giustino Menescardi

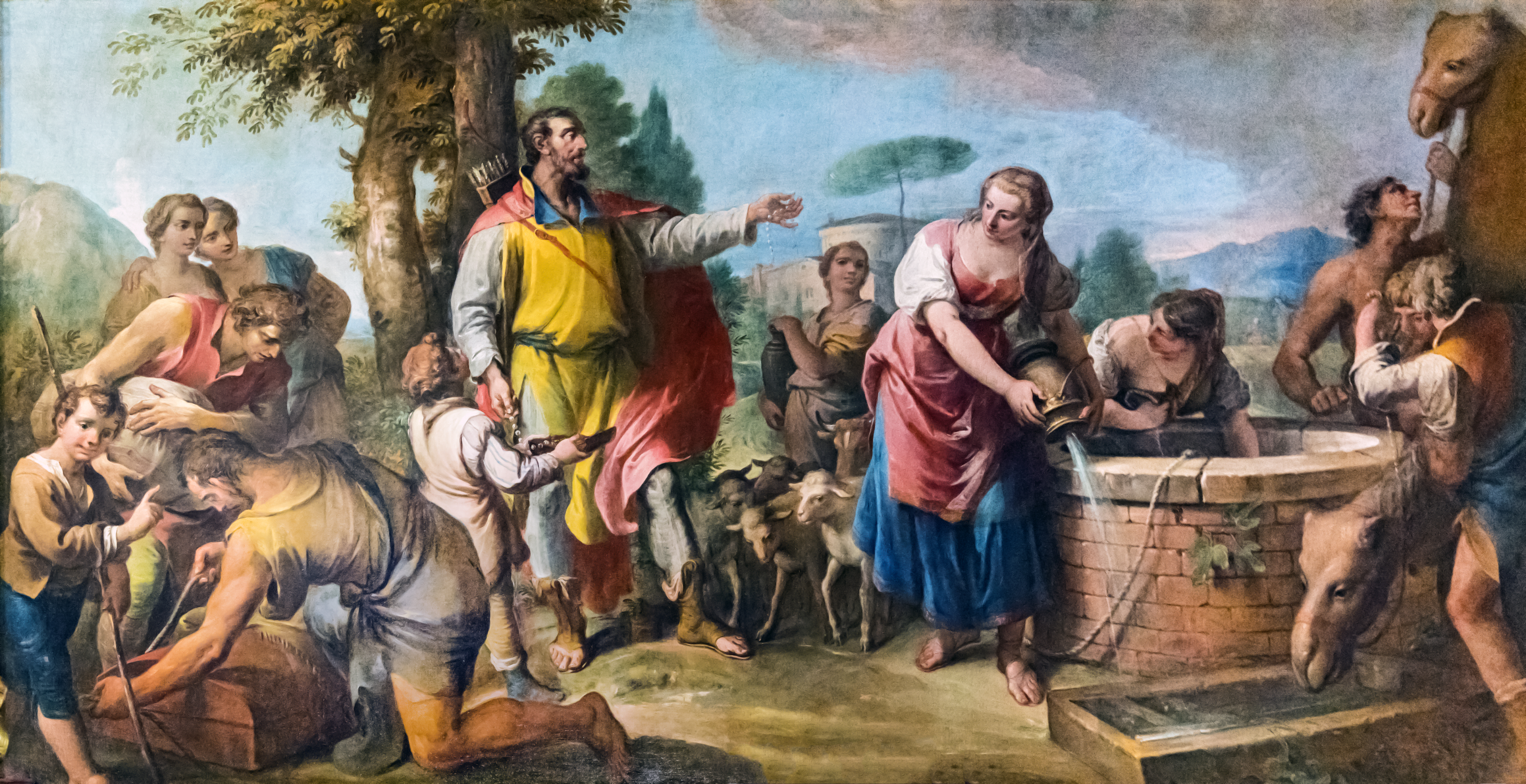
Rebecca at the Well par Gaetano Zompini
