= Luca Carlevarijs =

Italian painter and engraver (1663–1730)

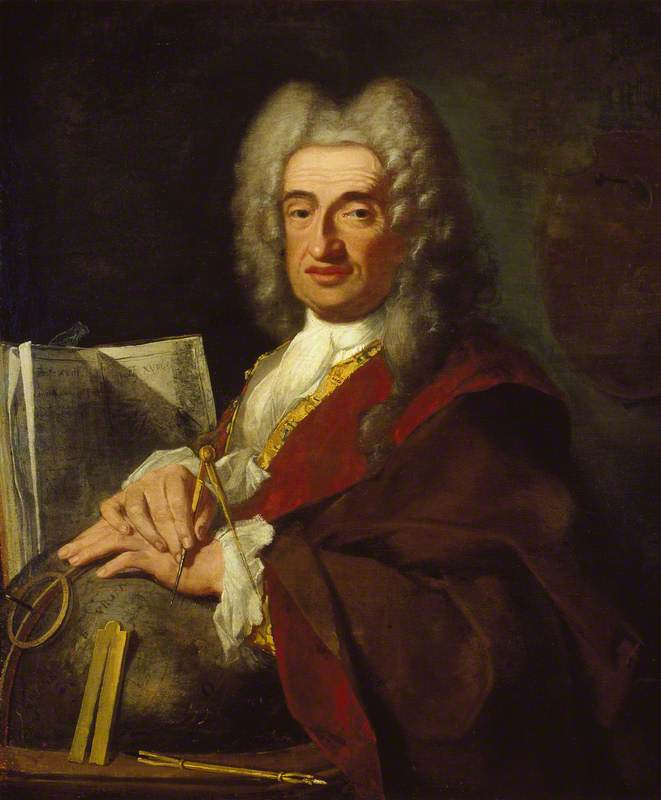
- Portrait (1724) by Bartolomeo Nazari
- Born: Luca Carlevaris; 20 January 1663; Udine, Republic of Venice
- Died: 12 February 1730 (aged 67); Venice, Republic of Venice
- Known for: Landscape art

Luca Carlevarijs or Carlevaris (20 January 1663 – 12 February 1730) was an Italian painter and engraver working mainly in Venice. He pioneered the genre of the cityscapes (vedute) of Venice, a genre that was later widely followed by artists such as Canaletto and Francesco Guardi.

== Life and work ==
Carlevarijs was born in Udine. He was also known as 'Luca Casanobrio' or 'Luca di Ca Zenobri', for his patronage by the latter family. He worked principally in Venice, where he also died. His daughter, Marianna Carlevarijs (1703 - 1750) learned the art of pastel portraiture from Rosalba Carriera.

Carlevarijs visited Rome. Here he was influenced by the Dutch painter Caspar van Wittel (often called Vanvitelli), who was a long-term resident of Rome. Van Wittel was the pioneer of the genre of vedute of Rome. Carlevarijs then started to create vedute of Venice, which are among the earliest Baroque depictions of the city.

He painted landscapes, sea-pieces and perspective views. His works included cityscapes with a topological interest as well as imaginary landscapes with ruins. He completed over a hundred etchings of views in Venice, which give an exact representation of the principal places in that city.

The painters Canaletto, Francesco Guardi and Antonio Visentini are said to have been influenced by his work or even have been his pupils. His paintings and his set of 104 etched views of Venice, which were published in 1703, were the foundation on which Canaletto and Guardi built. Johan Richter collaborated with him. He also collaborated with specialist figure painters who added the staffage into his landscapes or cityscapes. He worked mostly in Venice.

== Gallery ==
Paintings

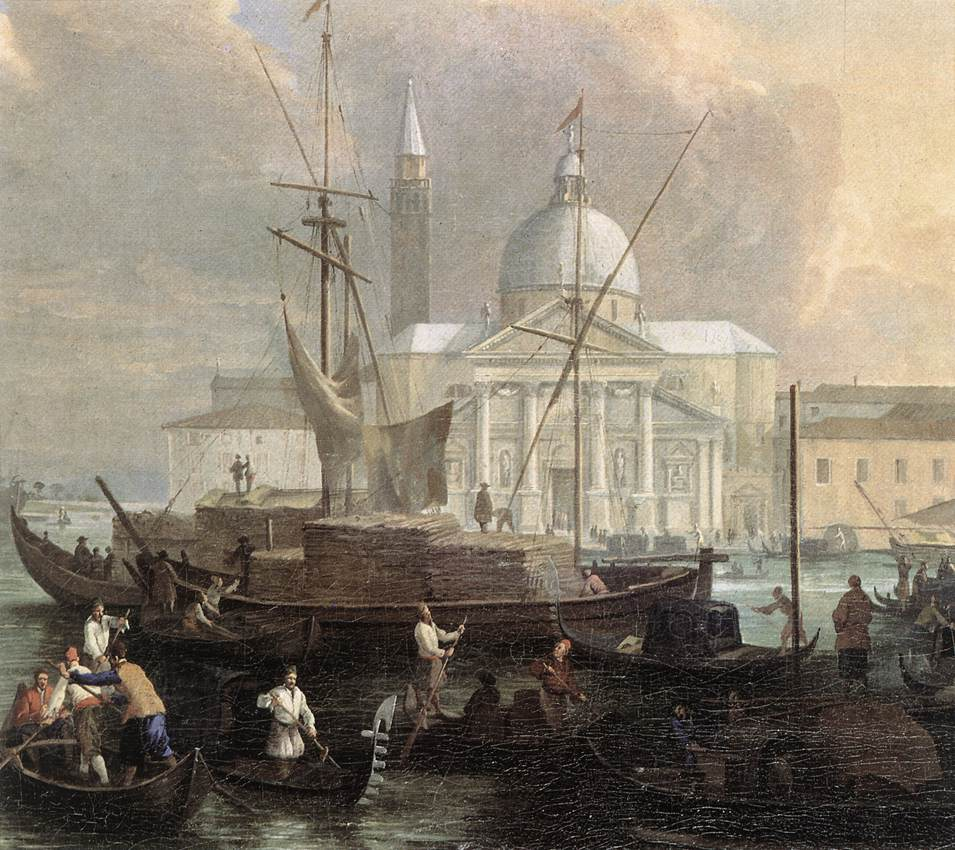
Custom House with San Giorgio Maggiore

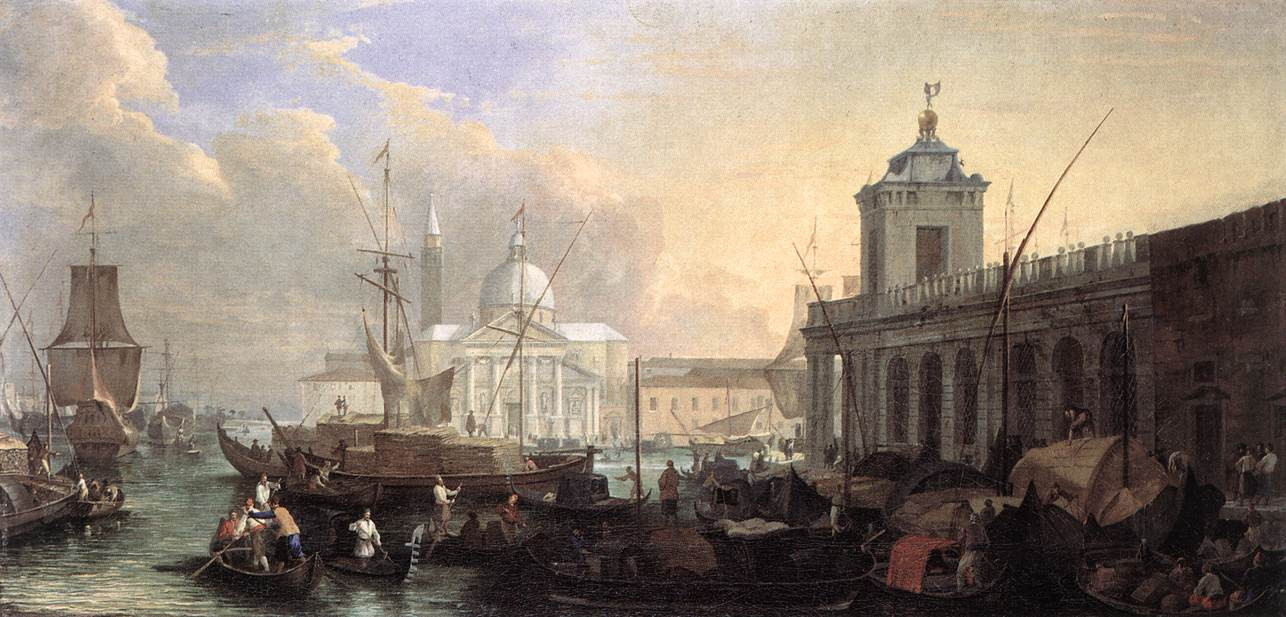
Custom House with San Giorgio Maggiore

Doge's Palace and Riva degli Schiavoni

Reception of the French ambassador César d'Estrées

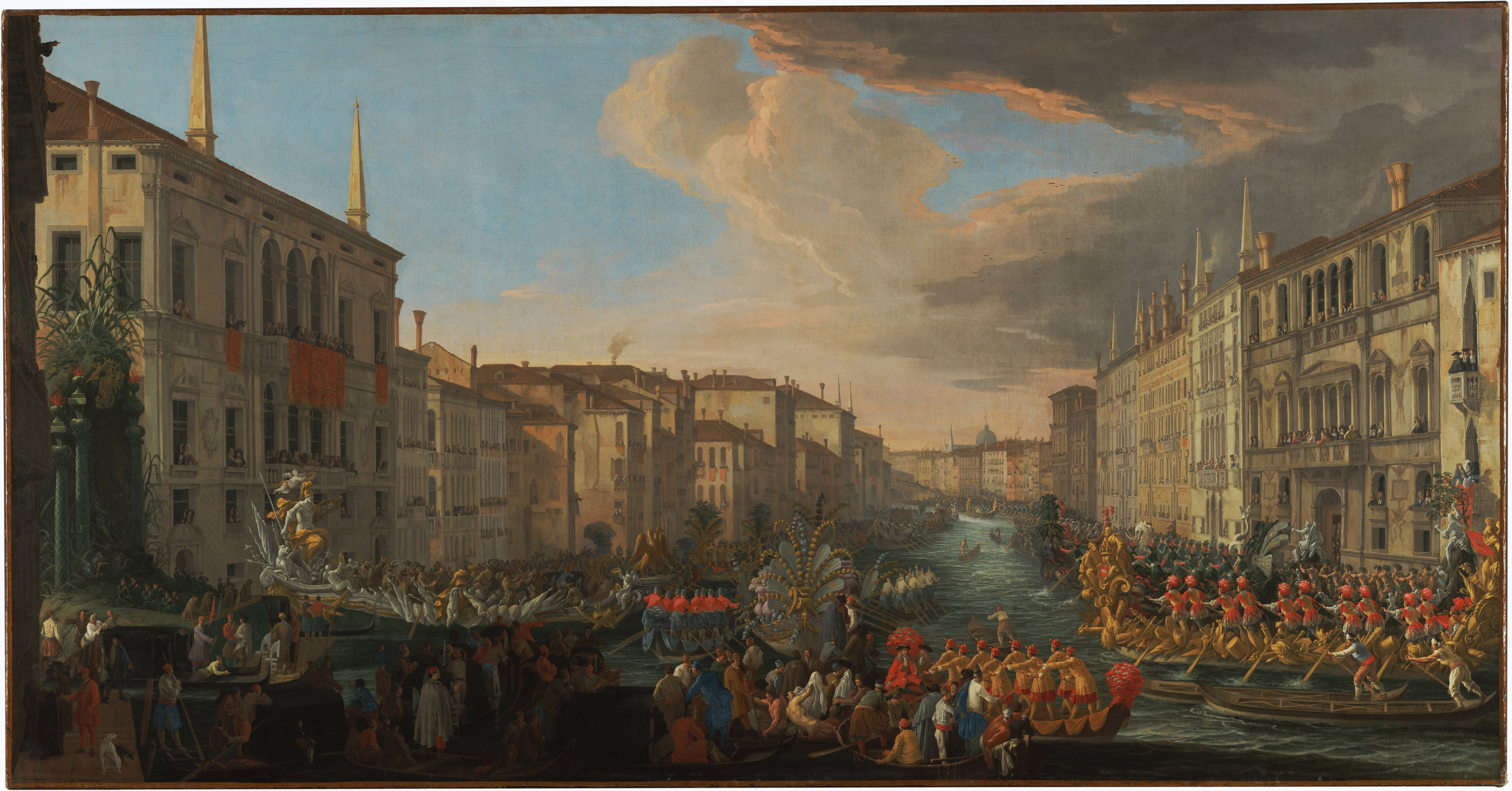
Regatta on the Grand Canal in Honor of Frederick IV, King of Denmark

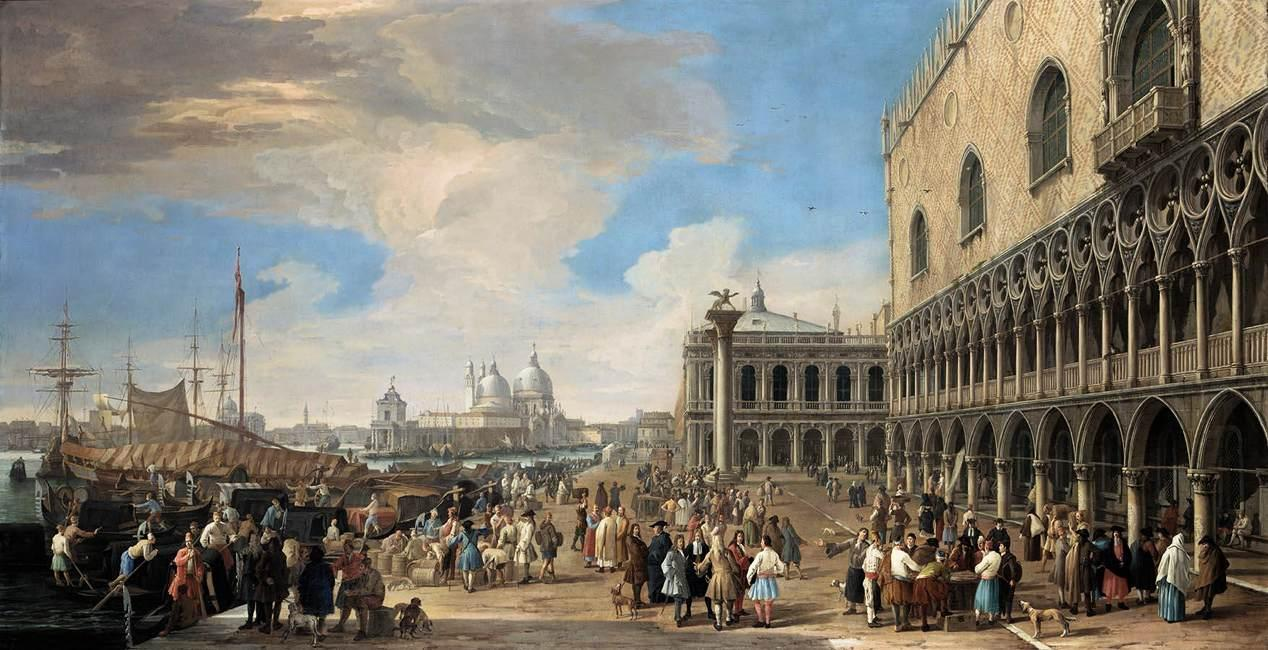
View of Molo

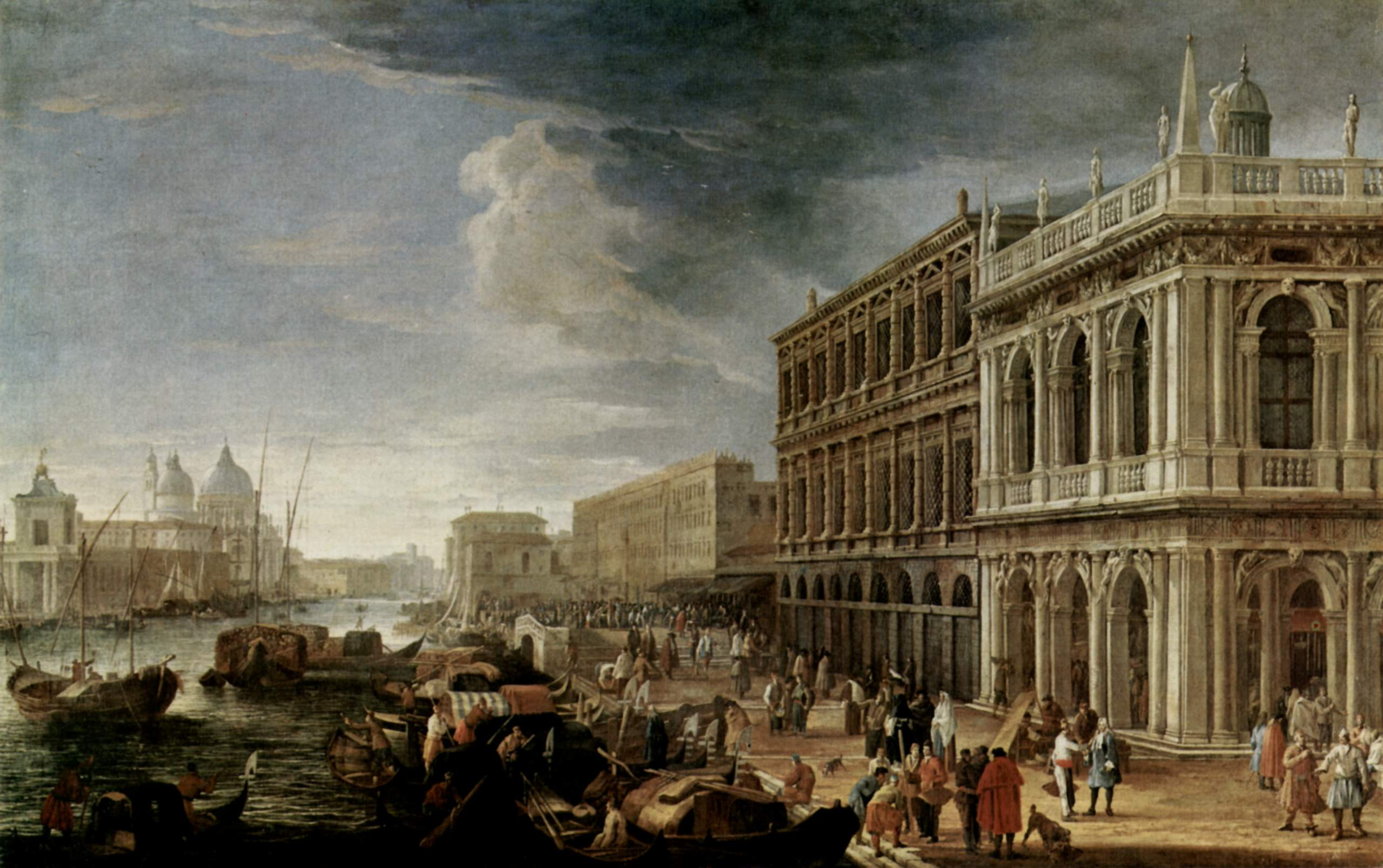
Riva degli Schiavoni with view to Salute

The Bucentaur Departing from the Bacino di San Marco

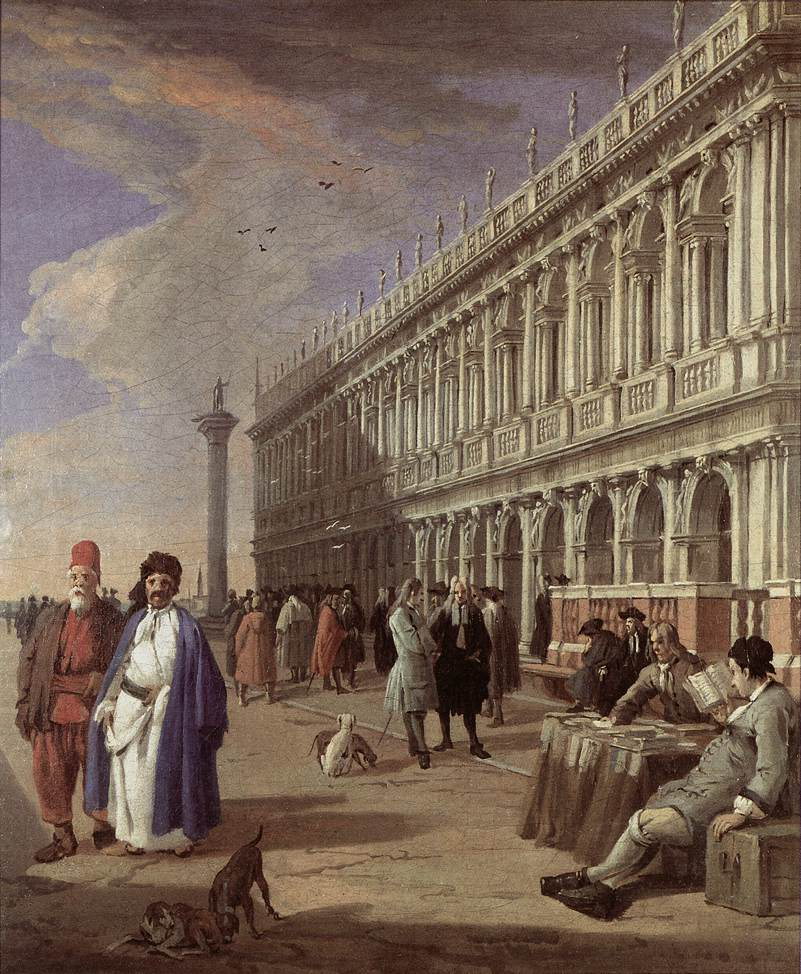
Piazzetta and Library

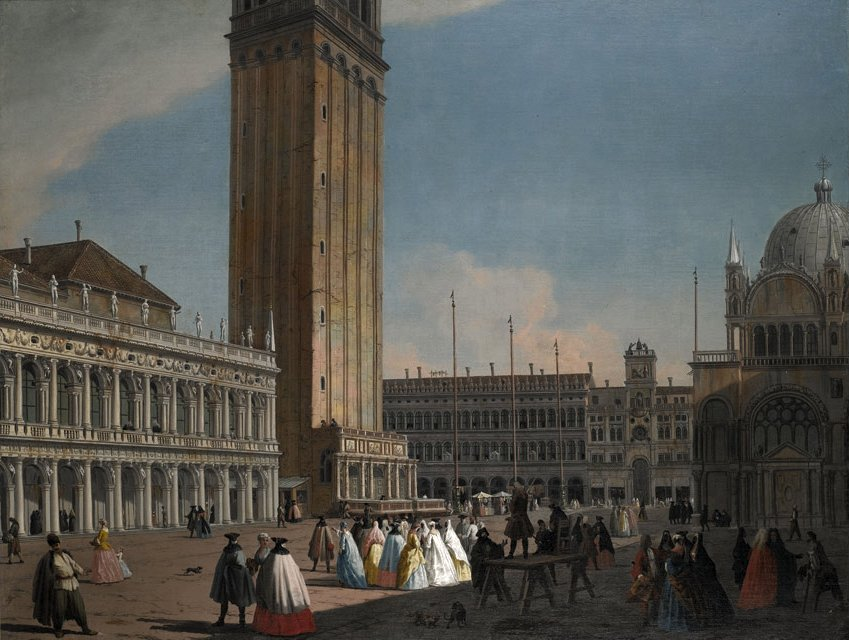
Piazzetta

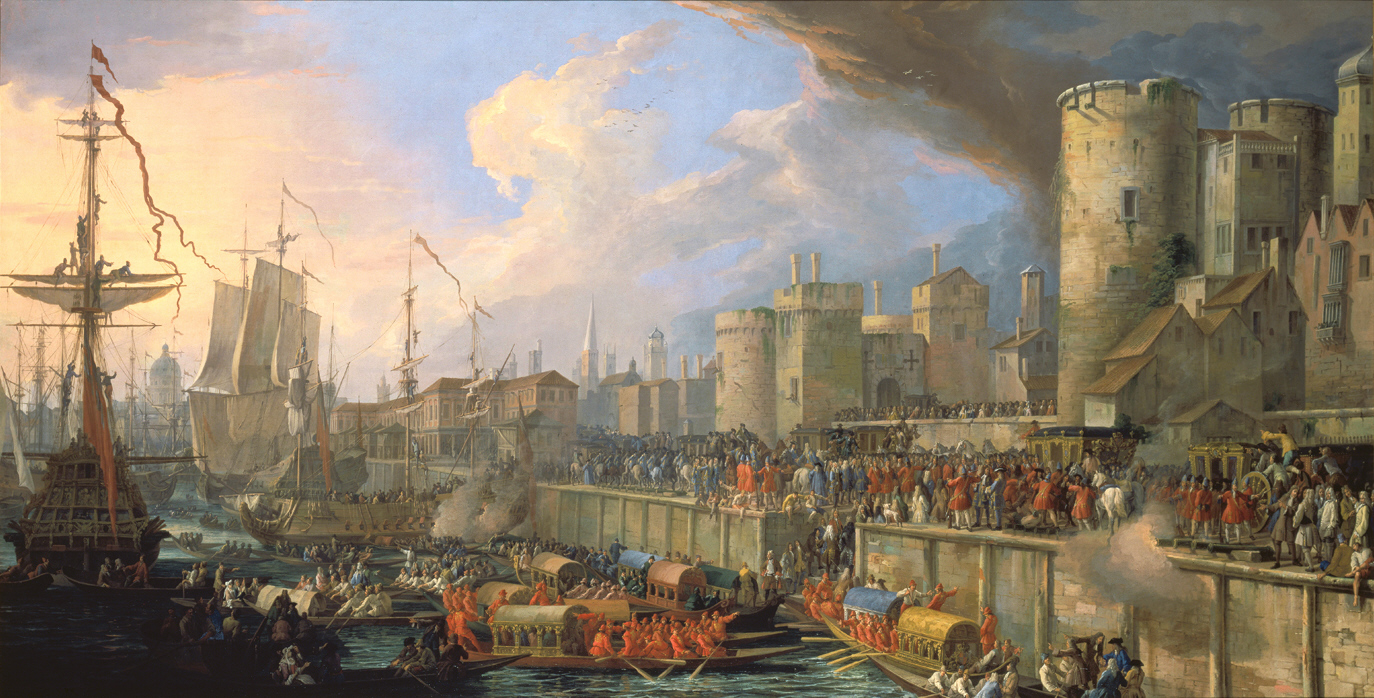
Entry of the Venetian ambassador to London

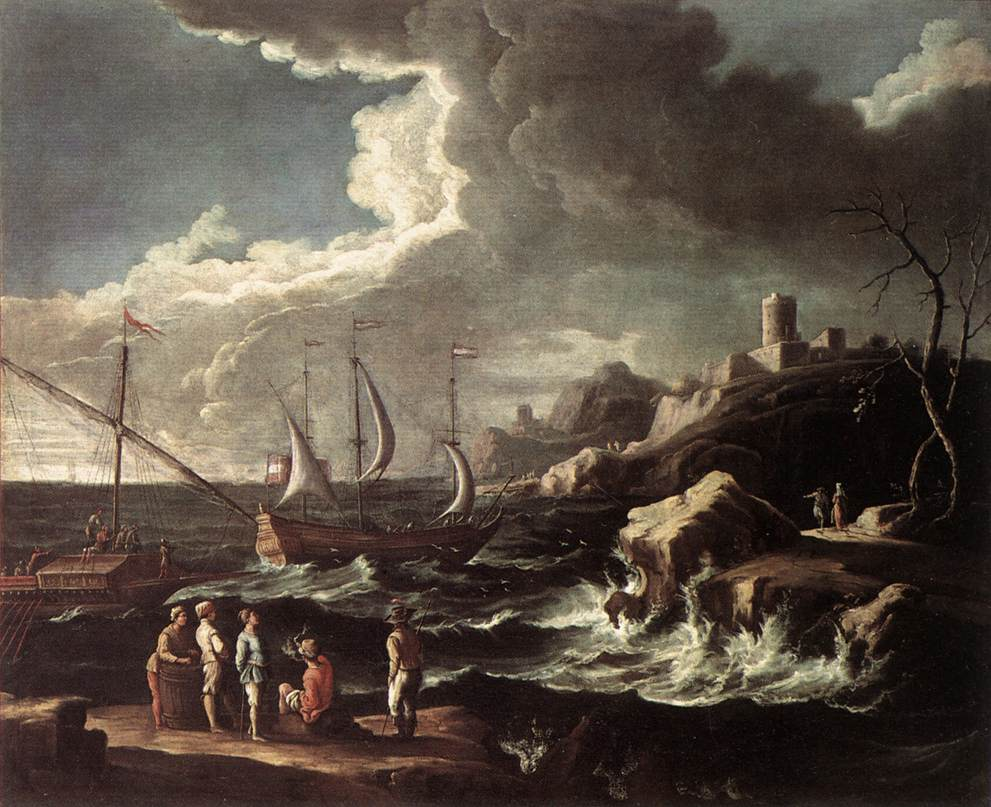
Seascape

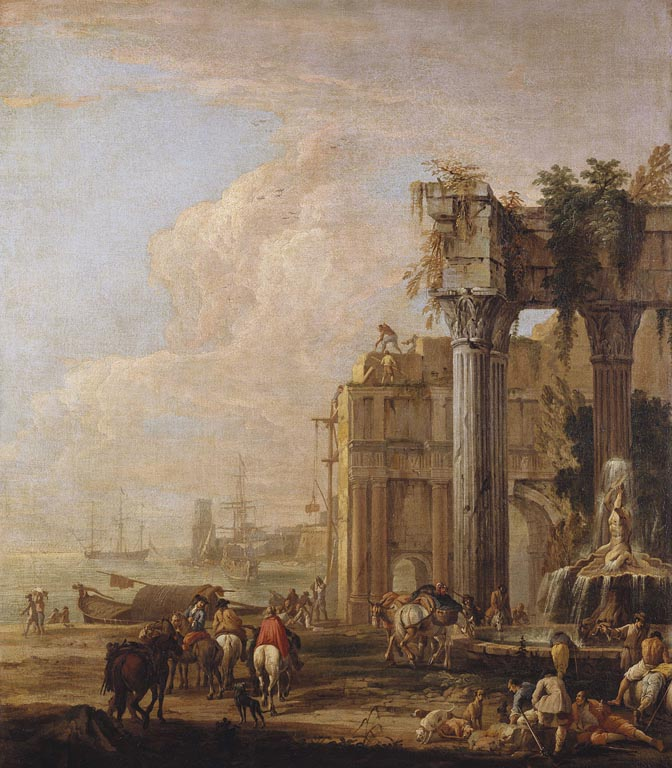
A Seaport with a Fountain and Ruins

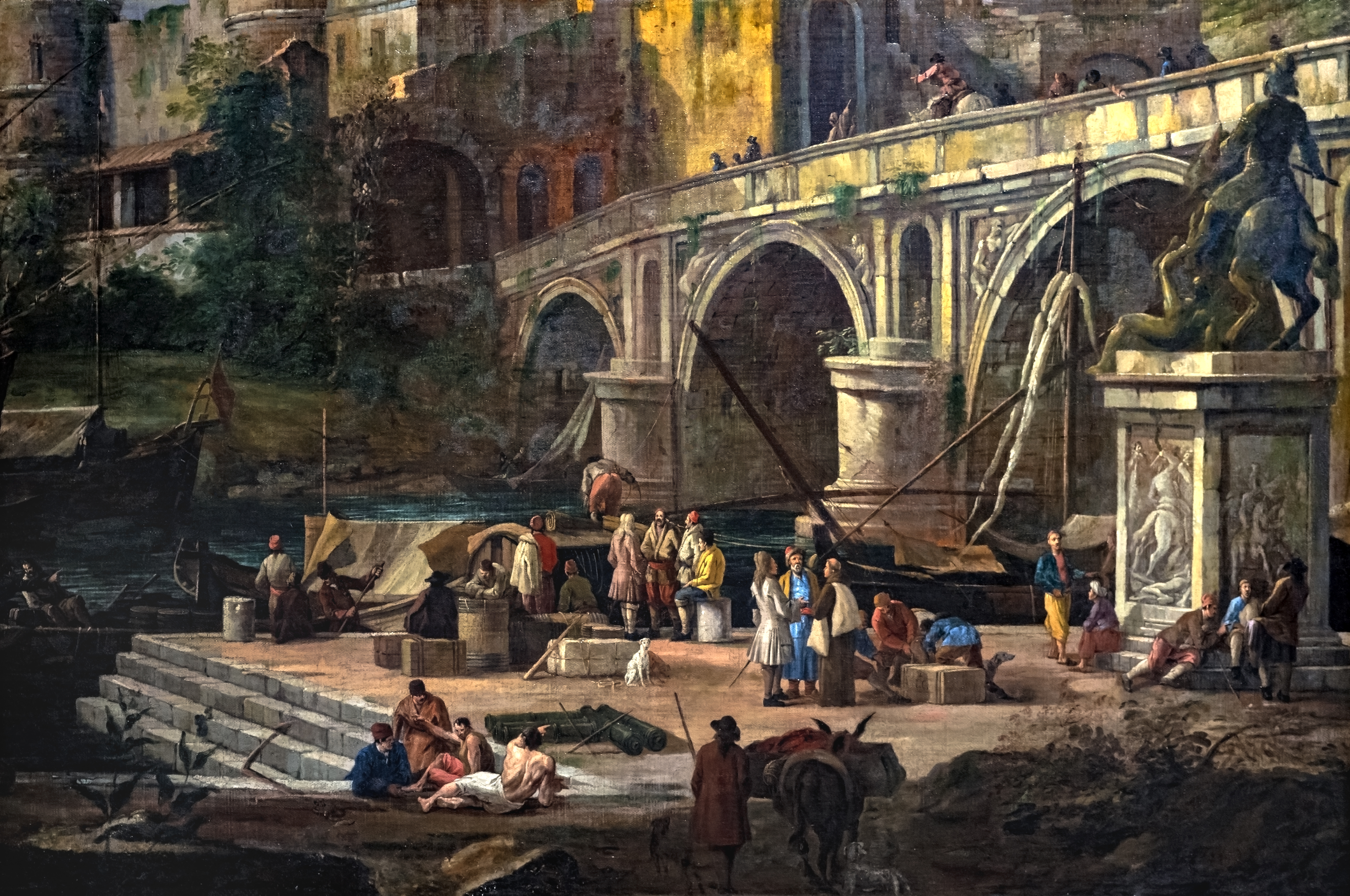
View of a River Port

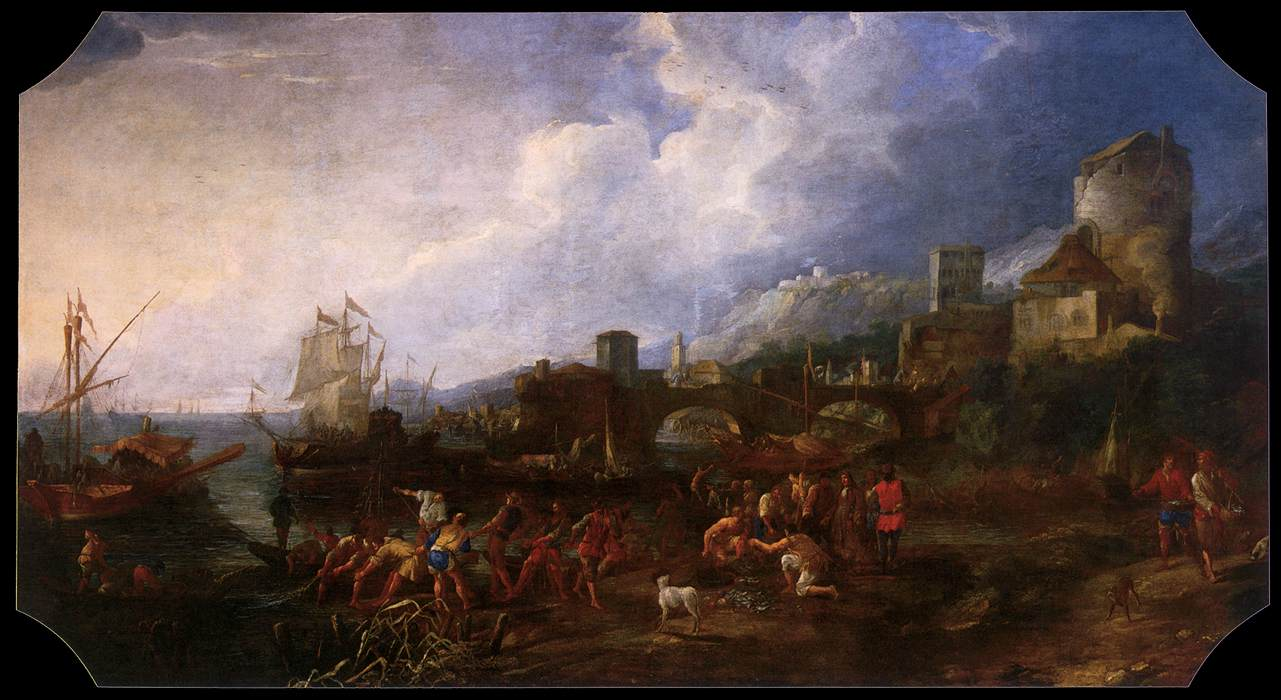
Seaport

Capriccio

Engravings

Palazzo Mocenigo, 1703, Metropolitan Museum of Art, New York

San Lazzaro dei Mendicanti, 1703, National Gallery of Art, Washington, D.C.

View of the Dogana da Mar at the confluence of the Grand Canal and Giudecca Canal, 1703, Metropolitan Museum of Art, New York

Palazzo Contarini degli Scrigni, 1703, Metropolitan Museum of Art, New York

== Sources ==
- Wittkower, Rudolf (1993). Art and Architecture Italy, 1600-1750. 1980. Penguin Books Ltd.
- Aldo Rizzi, Disegni incisioni e bozzetti del Carlevarijs, Doretti - Udine 1963
- Aldo Rizzi, Luca Carlevarijs, Alfieri - Venice 1967
- Aldo Rizzi, I maestri della pittura veneta del '700, Electa - Milano 1973
- Bryan, Michael (1886). Robert Edmund Graves (ed.). Dictionary of Painters and Engravers, Biographical and Critical. Vol. I: A-K. London: George Bell and Sons. pp. 232–233.
