= Sante Piatti =

Italian painter

Sante Piatti (1687–1747) was an Italian painter of the Baroque period, active mainly in his native Venice. He is attributed to be a pupil of Giuseppe Diamantini, and possibly Gregorio Lazzarini. He appears to be influenced by Sebastiano Ricci. During 1726 and 1727 he was a member of the Venetian painter's guild (Fraglia). He painted a series of works for the Scuola Grande dei Carmini in Venice and an altarpiece of St Antony for the church of San Nicolò dei Mendicoli.

== Paintings from the Carmini, Venice ==
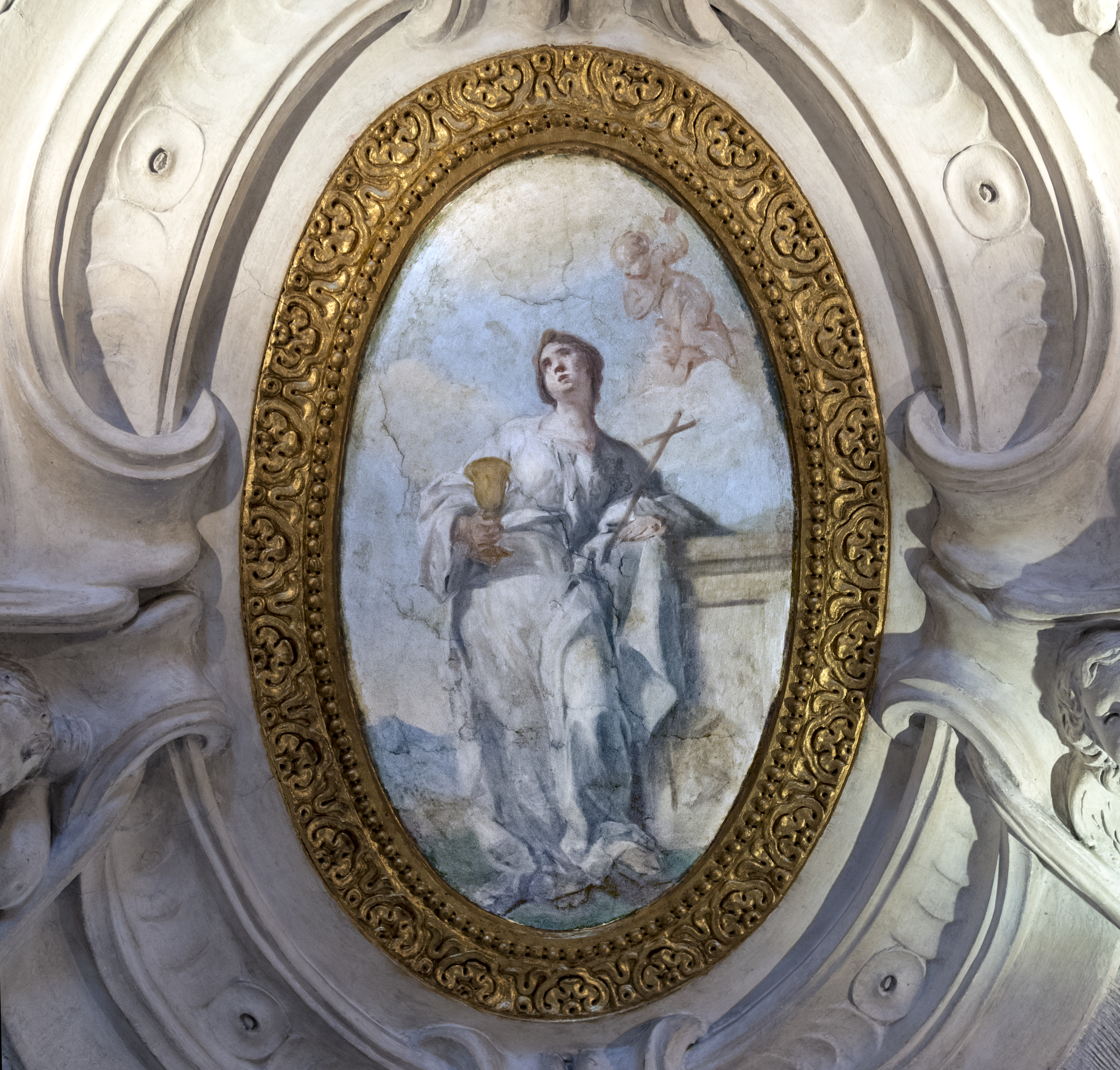
Faith

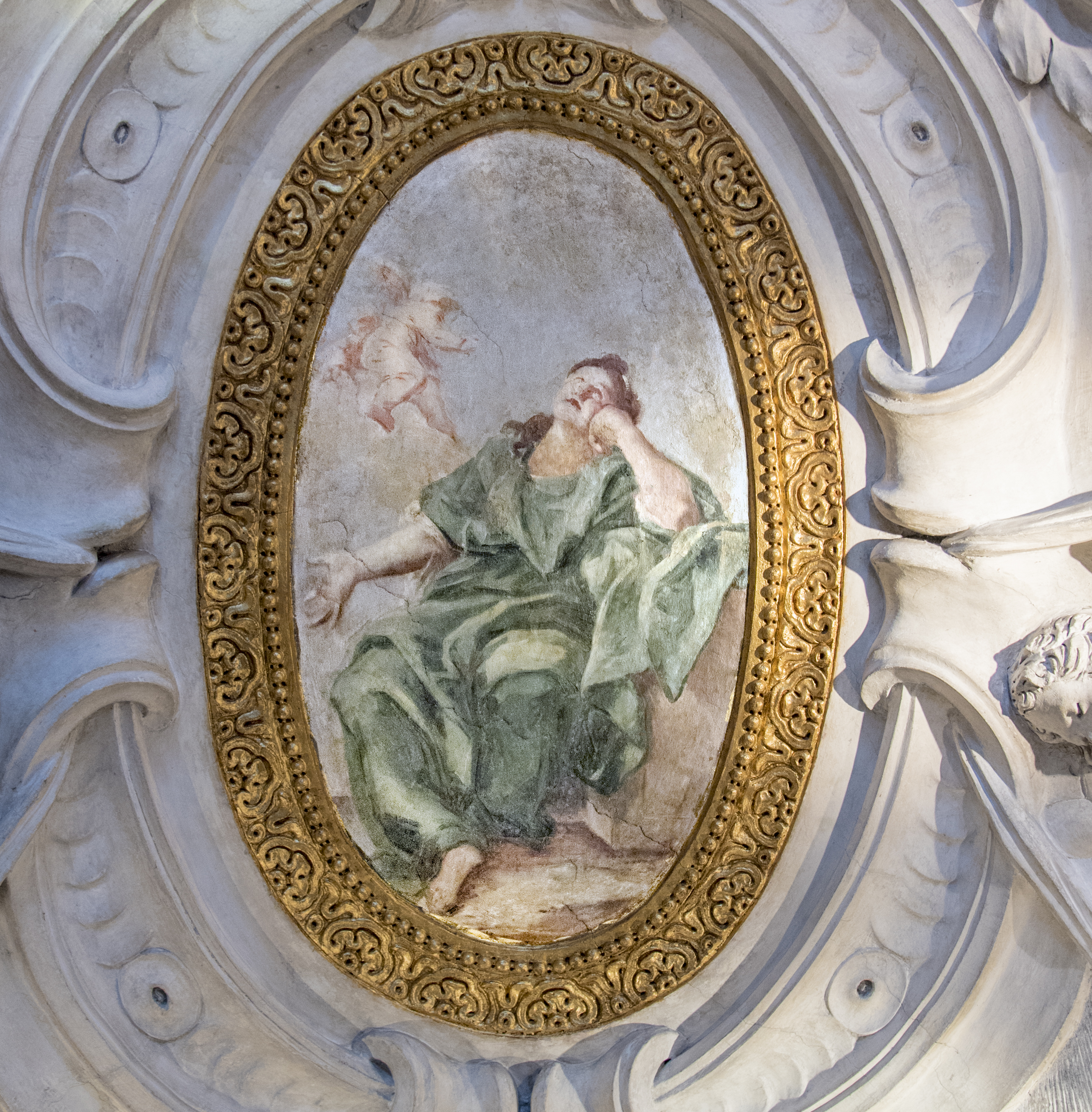
Hope

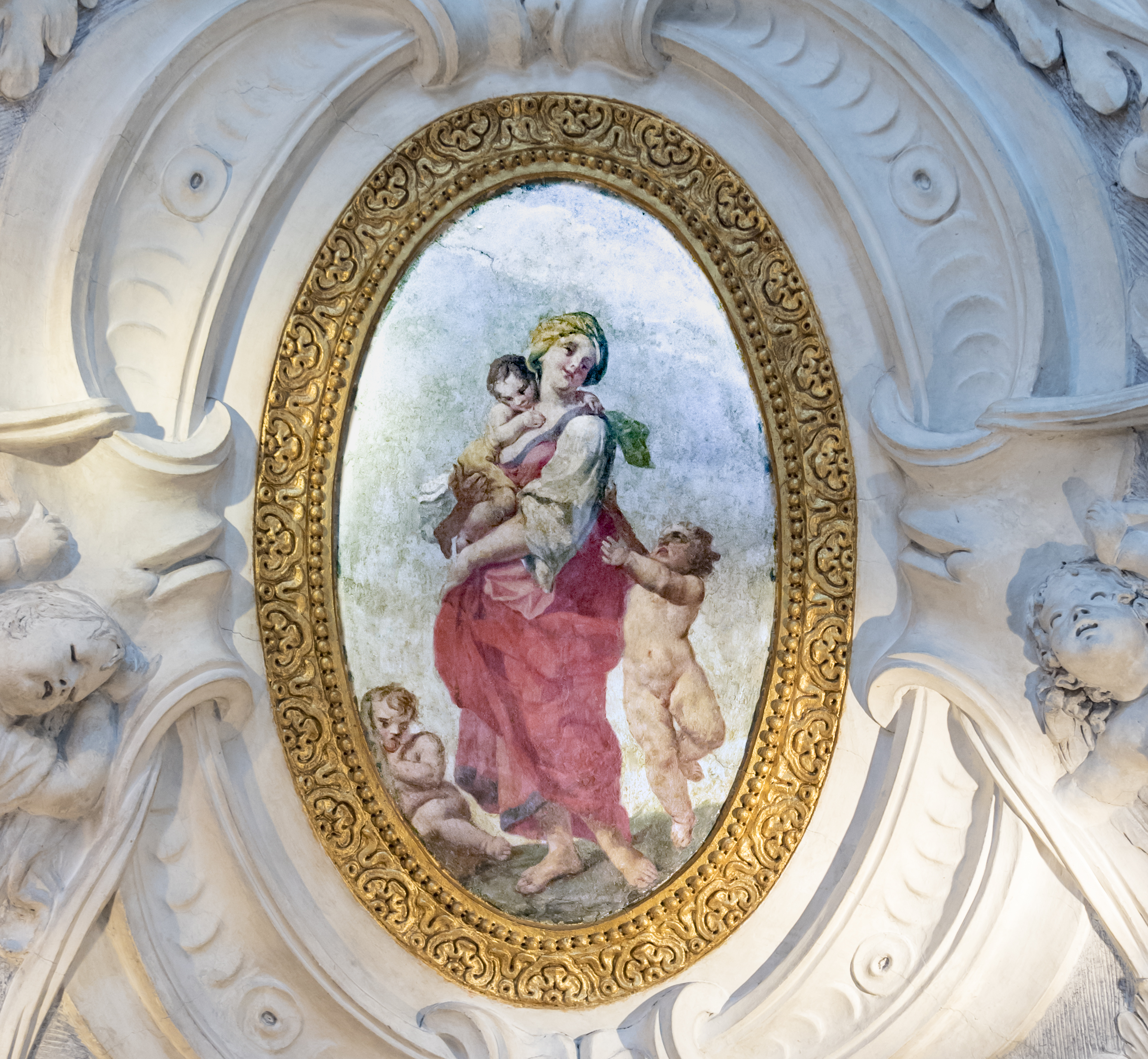
Charity
