= Giuseppe Diamantini =

Italian painter and engraver

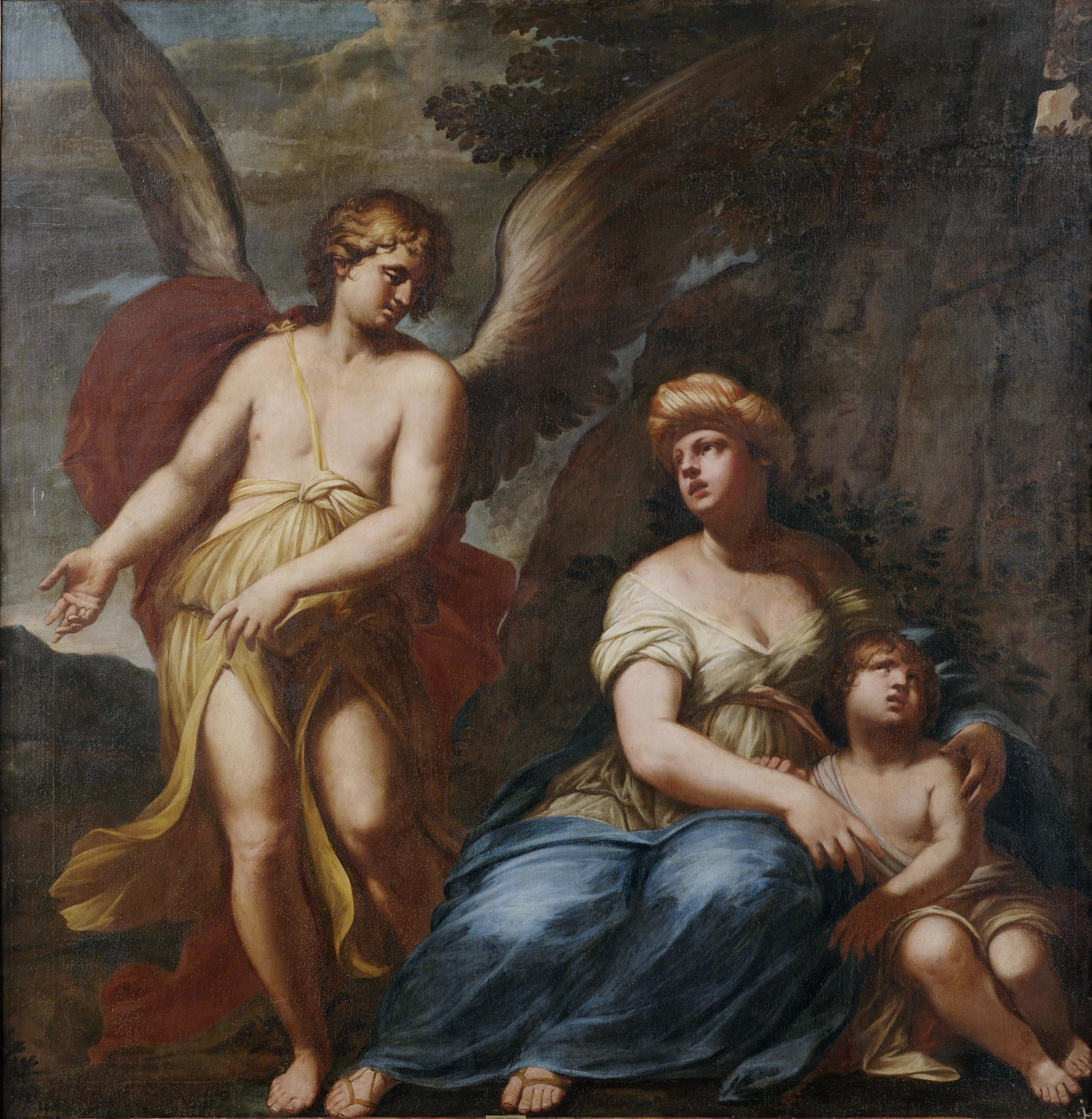
Angel Shows Hagar and Ishmael the Way to Saving Fountain (1705)

Giuseppe Diamantini (1621–11 November 1705) was an Italian painter and printmaker of the Baroque period, active mainly in Venice. Some sources cite varying dates for his life span including 1660–1722.

== Biography ==
He was born in Fossombrone. His early training is not well documented, but he arrived in Venice by c. 1650. He appears to have been a pupil or follower of Carracci.

He is known to have designed the title page of a libretto for the opera L’inganno riconosciuto by Camillo Contarini from 1666. He reputedly was an early mentor of Rosalba Carriera, and of the painter Sante Piatti. He painted a God the Father on the ceiling of the choir of the church of San Giovanni Crisostomo in Venice. He painted an altarpiece of the Adoration of the Magi for the church of San Moisè. He painted classical scenes of the gods Mercury and Argus, Juno, Jupiter and Io and Venus for the hall of the Palazzo Badoer (not to be confused with the villa) in Venice. He also produced a series of about 60 prints, mainly on classical mythological subjects. In 1698, Diamantini returned to Fossombrone, where he died.

He left a considerable number of plates, most of them etchings. Among his prints are:

- Holy Family with St. John holding a Cross.
- Hagar in the Desert.
- Marriage at Cana after Paolo Veronese.
- Dead Christ supported by an Angel.
- Death of Dido.
- Venus, Ceres, and Apollo.
- Mercury and Flora.
- Fall of Phaeton.
- Mercury and Argus
- Venus and Adonis.
- Mars and Venus.
- Diana and Endymion.
- Sacrifice of Iphigeneia.
- Boreas carrying off Orithyia.
- Justice and Peace. Eight emblematical subjects of different sizes.

== Bibliography ==
- Bryan, Michael (1886). Robert Edmund Graves (ed.). Dictionary of Painters and Engravers, Biographical and Critical. Vol. I: A-K. London: George Bell and Sons. p. 410.
- Abstract from Grove art encyclopedia
