= Portrait of a Woman with Mask =

Painting by Rosalba Carriera

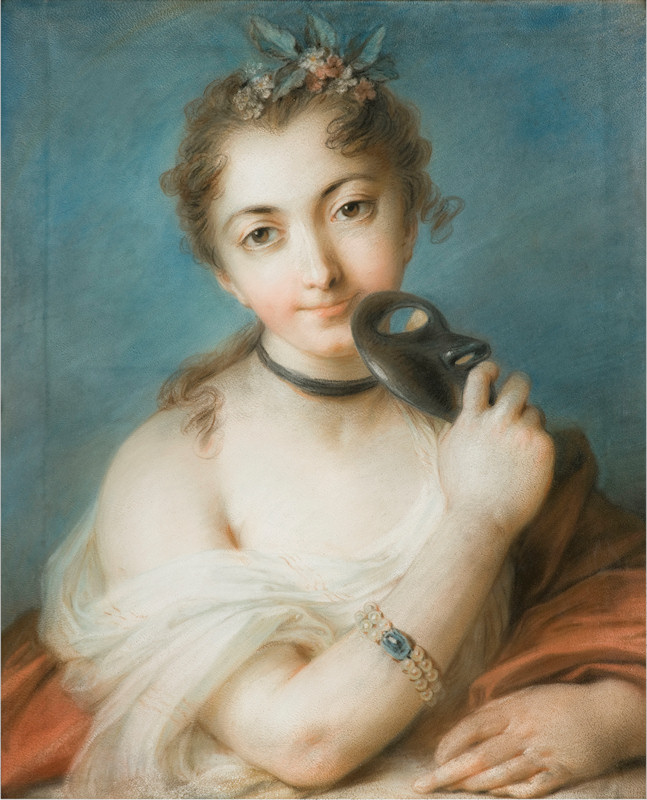
- Artist: Rosalba Carriera
- Year: 1720/1730
- Medium: Pastel on paper
- Dimensions: 56 cm × 47 cm (22 in × 19 in)
- Location: Palazzo Melzi d'Eril, Milan

The Portrait of a Woman with Mask is a pastel painting by the Venetian artist Rosalba Carriera, completed between 1720 and 1730. It is in the collection of the Palazzo Melzi d'Eril, in Milan. Its dimensions are 56 by 47 cm (22 by 19 in).

== History ==
The portrait is painted in pastels, by Rosalba Carriera. The year of execution is approximately assumed during after the artist's trip to Paris in 1720. Its provenance can be traced back from the Galleria Lorenzelli in Bergamo where it is documented by a label on the back of the portrait and an approximate drawn up in Italian lire by the Sotheby's without a detailed year. The portrait appears in the inventory from Intesa Leasing and merged into Fondazione Cariplo's collection in 1999.

== Description ==
"This portrait depicts a woman gazing directly at the viewer while holding a black Venetian moretta near her mouth, subtly blending sensuality with intrigue. She wears a pale, softly draped gown reminiscent of Classical statuary and allegorical deities, accented by a pearl armlet set with a blue gemstone, a fine neck ribbon, and flowers pinned in her hair."

== Bibliography ==
- Neil Jeffares, Charles-Antoine Coypel, in Dictionary of pastellists before 1800, introduction by P. Rosenberg, London, 2006, p. 147, ill., updated on 23 May 2017
- Elena Lissoni and Lucia Molino, edited by, The gentle soul. Art and life from Giovanni Agostino da Lodi to Vincenzo Irolli, exhibition catalog, Lodi, Palazzo Barni, 24 November 2017 – 31 January 2018, Silvana Editoriale, Cinisello Balsamo, 2017, n. 24, pp. 80–81
- Renata Casarin and Lucia Molino, edited by, Fate and destiny. Between myth and contemporaneity, exhibition catalog, Mantua, Palazzo Ducale Museum Complex, Appartamento della Rustica, 8 September 2018 – 6 January 2019, Silvana Editoriale, Cinisello Balsamo, 2018, n. 4, pp. 38–39

== Sources ==
- Cariplo Foundation Archive, fald. Purchase of Intesa Leasing works
