= Felicita Sartori =

Italian artist (1713–1782)

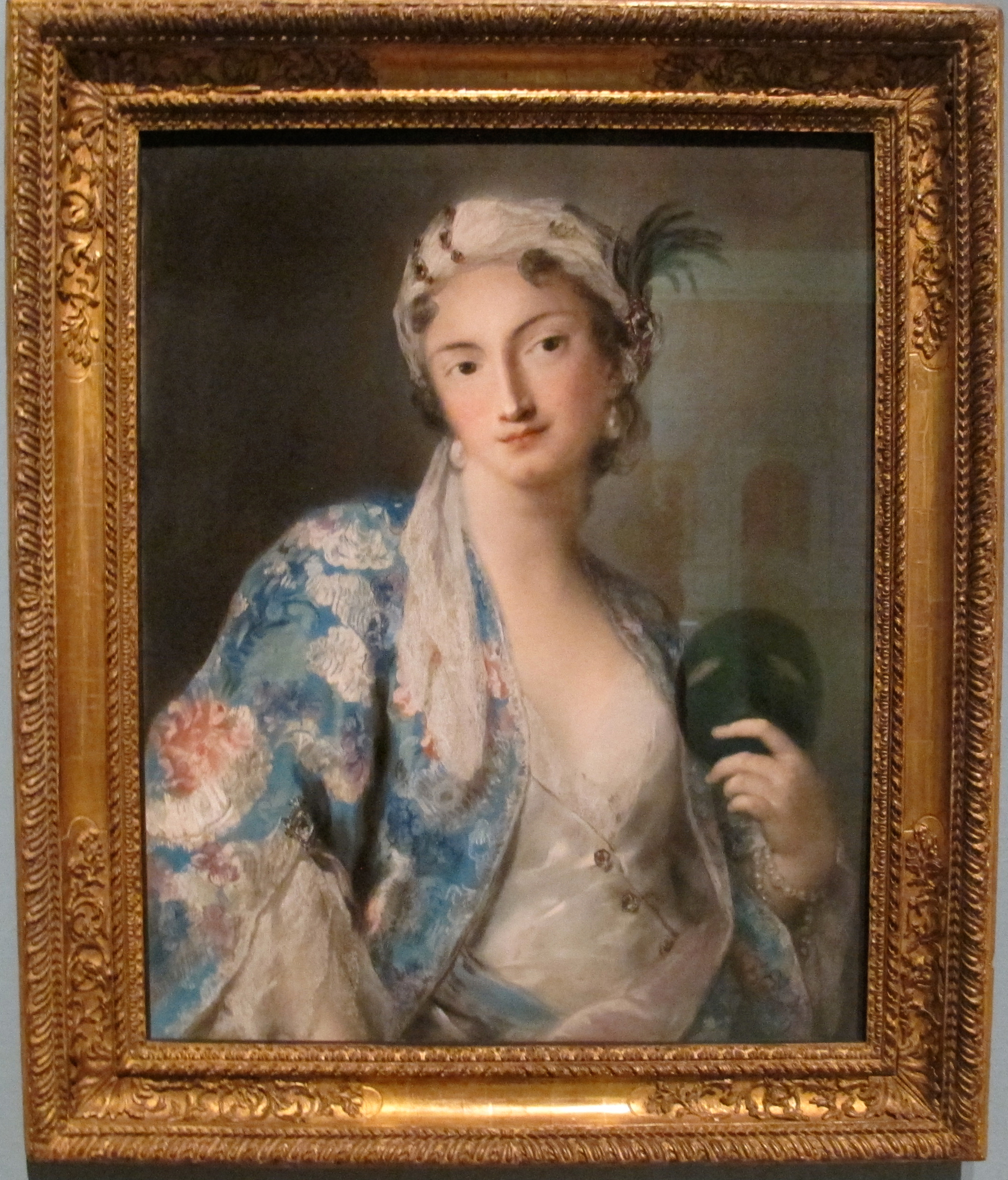
- Portrait by Rosalba Carriera, c. 1740
- Born: 7 September 1713; Pordenone, Friuli, Republic of Venice
- Died: 24 July 1782 (aged 68); Sacile, Friuli, Republic of Venice
- Occupation: Painter
- Spouses: Franz Joseph von Hoffmann (m. 1741; died 1749): Lothar Franz von Hoffmann

Felicita Sartori (later von Hoffmann; 7 September 1713 – 24 July 1782) was an Italian painter and pastellist.

== Life ==
Felicita Sartori was born in Pordenone, the daughter of notary Felice Sartori. Her uncle was Antonio dall'Agata, an engraver in Gorizia, and it was he who served as her first teacher. It was also he who arranged for her to join the studio of Rosalba Carriera, and she moved to Venice around 1728. Carriera was at the height of her popularity, and it is believed that Sartori, along with her sisters, provided copies of her work for sale. Sartori remained close to her teacher. In 1741, she moved to Dresden and married Franz Joseph von Hoffmann, councilor to August III. He died in 1749, at which point her movements became unclear; Sartori remarried to a nephew of her late husband, Lothar Franz Hoffmann, and probably moved to Bamberg.

The surviving works known to be hers are apparently all miniatures, mostly drawn from well-known works by Carriera; it is also recorded that she produced some copies in oil. An early biographer notes that she learned pastel before specializing in miniatures, and the extent of her work in the medium is unclear, although it seems likely that some of those copies in pastel of Carriera's work which survive might be hers. Around 19 miniatures survive in Dresden; all date to her time in that city. A portrait of Sartori by her teacher is held by the Uffizi Gallery.

She died on 24 July 1782 in Sacile, where she had settled around 1760 to be closer to her family.
