= Marianna Carlevarijs =

Italian painter (1703–1750)

Marianna Carlevarijs (1703 – 1750) was an Italian painter, active mainly in Venice, creating pastel portraits.

== Biography ==
Marianna was the daughter of the prominent Venetian painter of vedute, Luca Carlevarijs. She was a friend, and pupil in the style and subject matter, of Rosalba Carriera.

== Works ==
- Portrait of Girolamo Maria Balbi, sala dei pastelli, Ca Rezzonico Museum, Venice
- Portrait of Cornelia Foscolo Balbi, sala dei pastelli, Ca Rezzonico Museum, Venice
- Portrait of Marco e Caterina Balbi, sala dei pastelli, Ca Rezzonico Museum, Venice
- Portrait of a Young Woman, Private Collection
- Portrait of Unknown Gentleman
- Allegory of Peace, Museo Civici of Vicenza
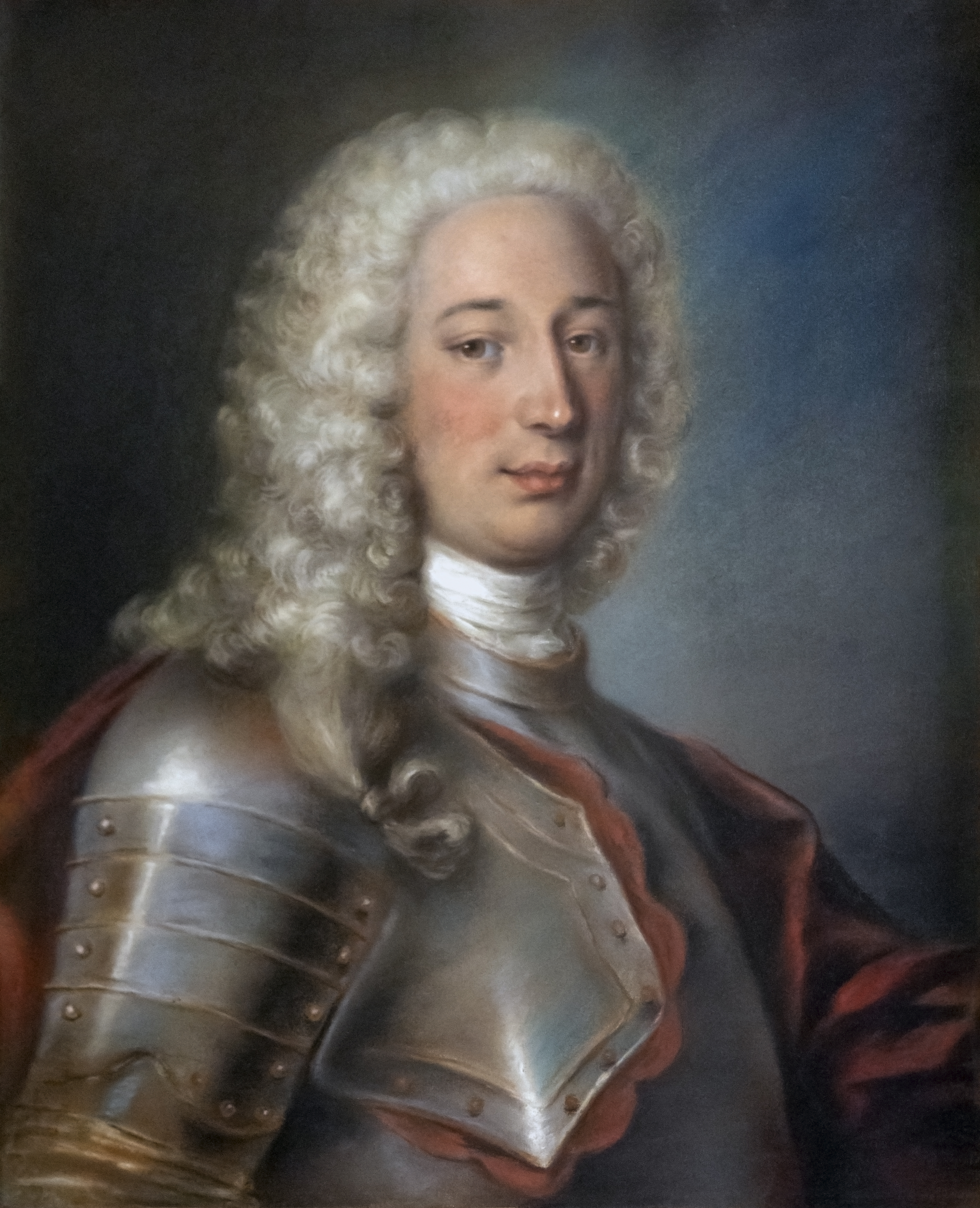
Portrait of Girolamo Maria Balbi, Ca Rezzonico Museum, Venice

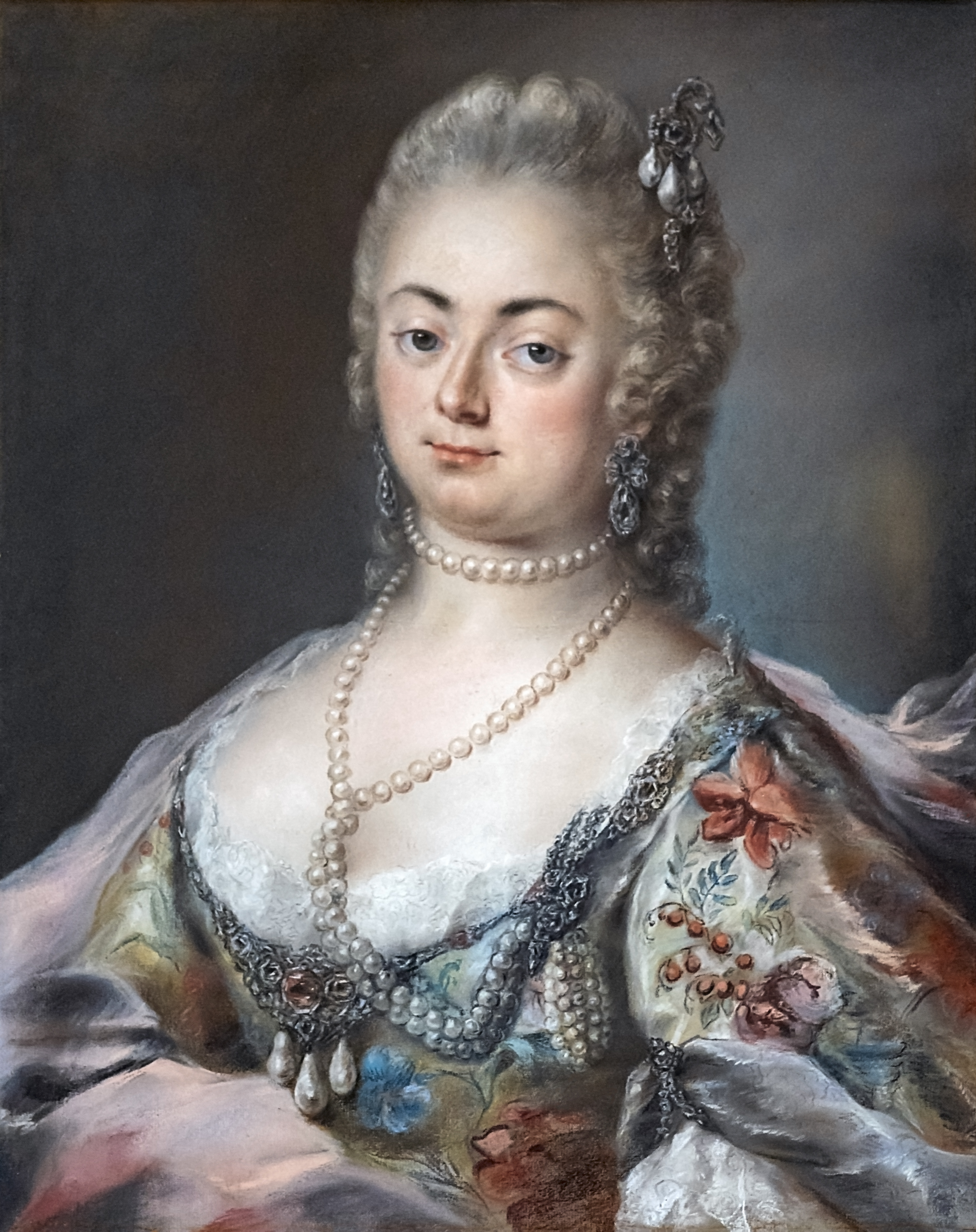
Portrait of Cornelia Foscolo Balbi, Ca Rezzonico Museum, Venice

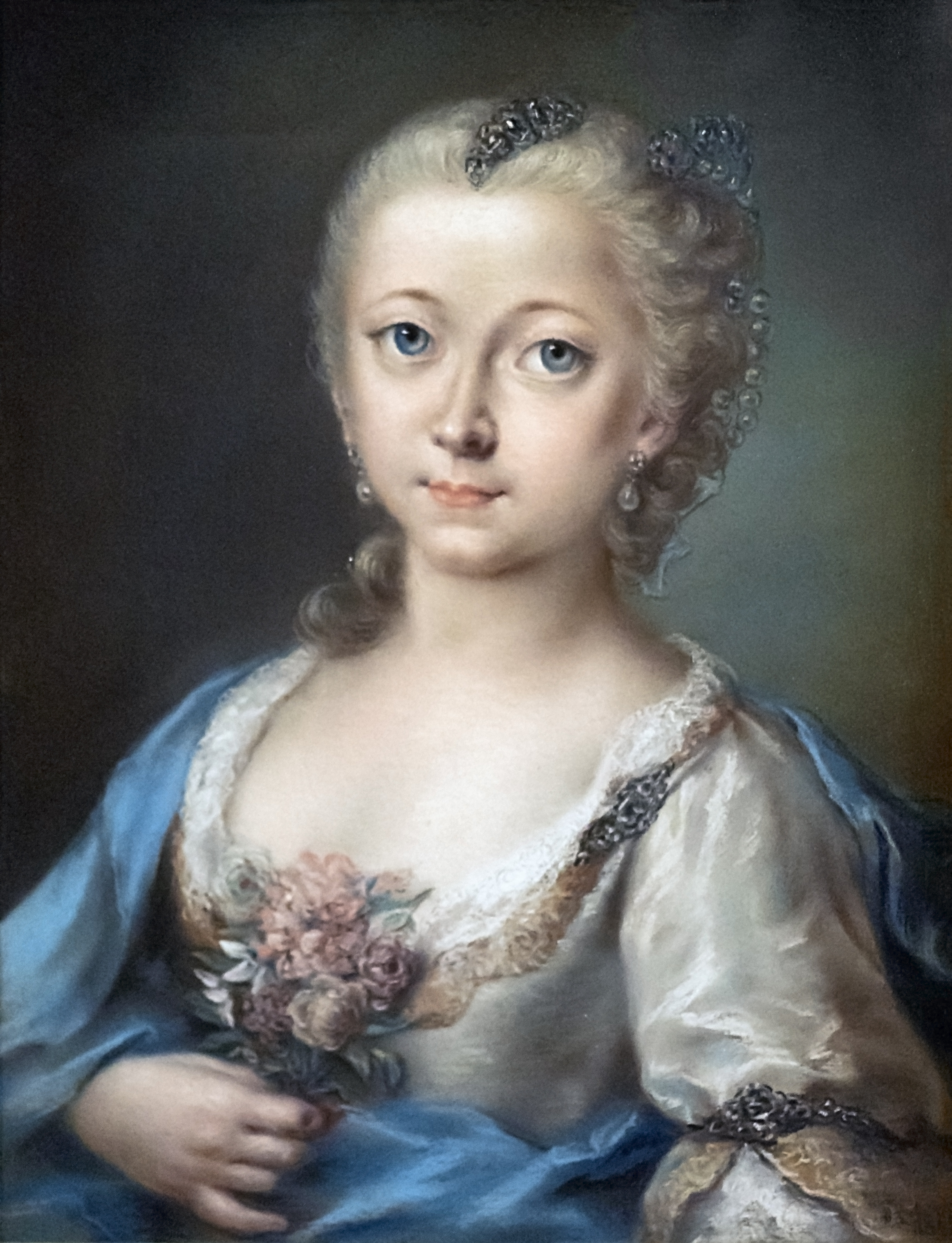
Portrait of Caterina Balbi, Ca Rezzonico Museum, Venice

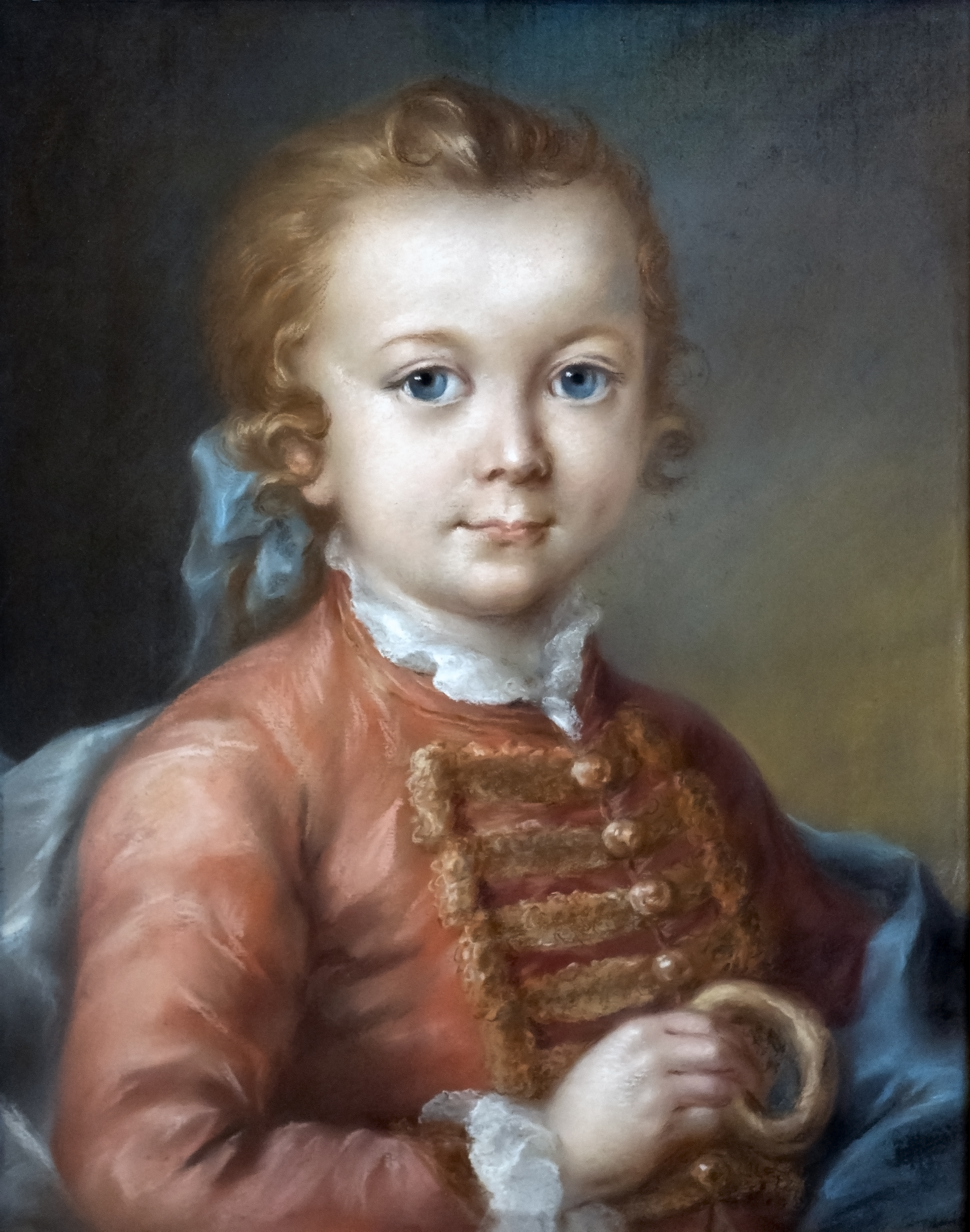
Portrait of Marco Balbi, Ca Rezzonico Museum, Venice
