= Rosalba Carriera =

Italian artist (1673–1757)

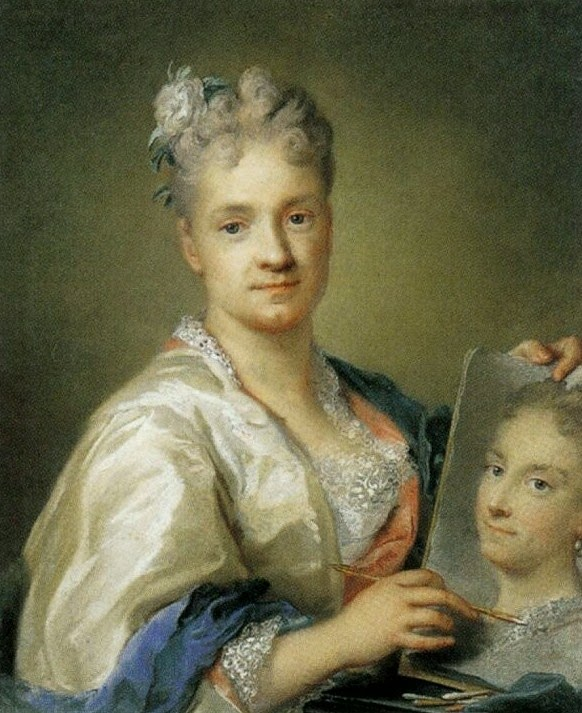
- Self-portrait, 1715
- Born: 12 January 1673; Venice, Republic of Venice
- Died: 15 April 1757 (aged 84); Venice, Republic of Venice
- Known for: Portrait painting
- Movement: Rococo

Rosalba Carriera (12 January 1673 – 15 April 1757) was an Italian Rococo painter. In her younger years, she specialized in portrait miniatures. Carriera would later become known for her pastel portraits, helping popularize the medium in eighteenth-century Europe. She is remembered as one of the most successful women artists of any era.

== Biography ==
Carriera was born in Venice to Andrea Carriera, a lawyer, and Alba Foresti, an embroiderer and lacemaker. With her mother and sisters, Rosalba engaged in lace-making and other crafts. Her reasons for establishing her own studio as an artist remain unknown. An early biographer, Pierre-Jean Mariette, suggested that when the lace industry began to falter, Carriera had to find a new means of providing for herself and her family.

The popularity of snuff-taking gave her an opportunity. Carriera began painting miniatures for the lids of snuff-boxes and as independent objects. She was among the first painters to use ivory instead of vellum as a support for miniatures. Soon, she also began producing portraits in pastel. Prominent foreign visitors to Venice, such as diplomats and young sons of the nobility on their Grand Tour, sought out her work. The portraits of her early period include those of Maximilian II of Bavaria; Frederick IV of Denmark; the "Artist and her Sister Naneta" (Uffizi); and Augustus the Strong, King of Poland and Elector of Saxony, who acquired a large collection of her pastels.

By 1700, Carriera was already painting miniatures and by 1703 she had completed her first pastel portraits. In 1704, she was made an Accademico di merito by the Roman Accademia di San Luca, a title reserved for non-Roman painters.

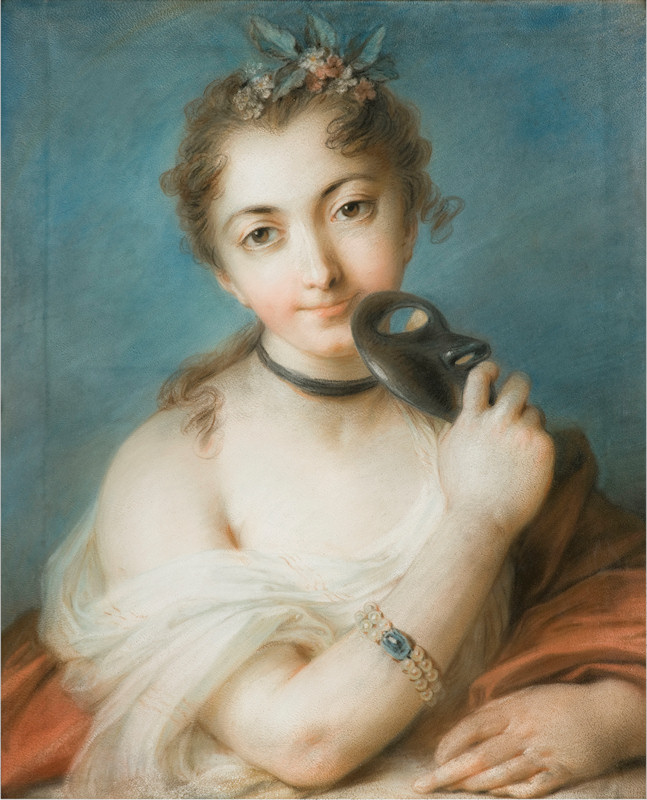
Portrait of a Woman with Mask, (Fondazione Cariplo).

Between 1720 and 1721, Carriera worked in Paris, where her work was in great demand. While in Paris, Carriera was a guest of the great amateur and art collector, Pierre Crozat. She painted Watteau, all the royalty and nobility from the King and Regent downwards, and was elected a member of the Académie royale by acclamation. Her brother-in-law, the painter Antonio Pellegrini, married to her sister Angela, was also in Paris that year, and was employed by John Law, a Scottish financier and adventurer, to paint the ceiling of the Grande Salle in Law's new bank building, the Hotel de Nevers.

Carriera's other sister, Giovanna, and her mother, accompanied her to France. Both sisters, particularly Giovanna, helped her in painting the hundreds of portraits she was asked to execute. This was because she undertook a lot of work in order to support her family. Carriera's diary of these 18 months in Paris was later published by her devoted admirer, Antonio Zanetti, the Abbé Vianelli, in 1793. Her extensive correspondence has also been published.

In the short time she spent in Paris, Carriera's work contributed to forming the new aristocratic tastes of the court and by extension, the tastes of Parisians. No longer did art serve only the monarchy's needs. She injected her free style, sense of colour and charm into the Rococo style, to which she was closely associated and which soon dominated the arts. Despite her triumph in Paris, she returned to her home on the Grand Canal in Venice in 1721. Carriera, with her sister Giovanna in tow, visited Modena, Parma, and Vienna, and was received with much enthusiasm by rulers and courts.

In 1730, Carriera made a long journey to the royal court in Vienna, Austria. While there, the Emperor Charles VI became her benefactor and fully committed to supporting her work, amassing a large collection of more than 150 of her pastels. In return, Carriera gave the Empress formal artistic training. The works Carriera executed there were later to form the basis of the large collection in the Alte Meister Gallery in Dresden.

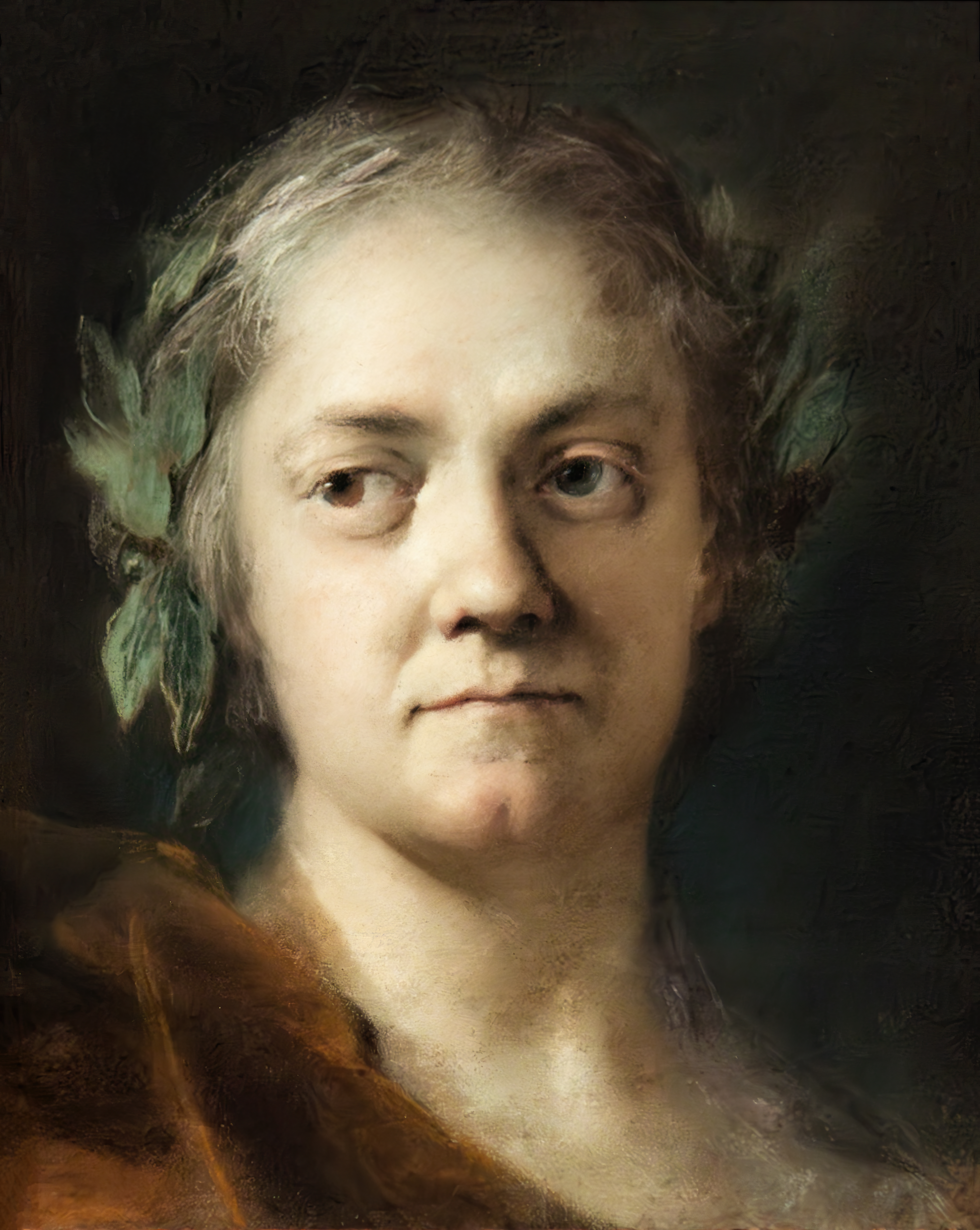
Self-portrait, c. 1746

After her sister Giovanna's death in 1738, Carriera fell into a deep depression, which was not aided by the loss of her eyesight some years later (her eyes might have been damaged by painting miniatures in her youth). She underwent two unsuccessful cataract surgeries but ended up losing her eyesight completely. She outlived all her family, spending her last years in a small house in the Dorsoduro district of Venice, where she died at the age of 84.

== Training ==
Carriera's mother taught her the art of lace making. Her training as a portraitist remains undocumented. It is possible that she studied with Giovanni Antonio Lazzari, Federico Bencovich, and Giuseppe Diamantini. She may also have been associated with Antonio Balestra, whose work she copied. There is speculation that the French painter Jean Steve encouraged her to make miniatures on ivory for the lids of snuffboxes, and that she received instruction in oil technique from Diamantini.

Carriera shared her talents with her sisters Giovana and Angela and later in life had female students such as Marianna Carlevarijs, Margherita Terzi, and Felicita Sartori.

== Influence ==
Carriera's influence would spread widely among many. In 1720 she provided King Louis XV with a portrait that completed the transition from the previously accepted style of the court. It was a shift between what looked powerful and a decorative style with international appeal. She revolutionised the world of technology by binding coloured chalk into sticks, which led to the development of a much wider range of prepared colours. This expanded the availability and the usefulness of the pastel medium.

Although negatively dubbed 'The Rococo' by Maurice Quai, a follower of the neoclassicist Jacques-Louis David, Carriera played an important role in popularising the style in France and later England, where King George III acquired a number of her works.

Despite her renown and contribution to an established manner, Carriera is "often treated as an exception, a rarity as a woman artist" and very often ignored. When the Rococo went out of fashion, Carriera's name and her impact was dismissed and that had very much to do with gender as well. Sir Joshua Reynolds owned several of her pastels.

== Works ==
Carriera was the first female painter to initiate a new style in the art community. The Rococo style emphasized the use of pastel colors; spontaneous brush strokes, dancing lights, subtle surface tonalities and a soft, elegant and charming approach to subject matter. She was known for dragging the sides of white chalk across an under-drawing of darker tones to capture the shimmering texture of lace and satin. She was also able to highlight facial features and the soft cascades of powdered hair. Because of her, artists created work in the style for nearly a century.

Carriera had many patrons who were interested in her work. Her earliest known pastel portrait depicts the collector Anton Maria Zanetti (1700) who procured many works by the artist and promoted her to other collectors when he travelled throughout Europe. Joseph Smith was another one of her admirers and he too collected a great amount of her works. King George III later purchased these pieces in 1762. That collection contained one of many of her self-portraits.

Her best-known self-portrait is one she contributed to the Medici collection of self-portraits at the Uffizi Gallery in Florence. This piece was different because she veered away from idealizing herself, as was a custom of the era. Instead, she was brusque and honest in her representation, featuring a larger nose, thin lips and a deep dimple in her chin. She holds a portrait of her sister and assistant Giovanna, to whom she was very close.

Her self-portrait work diverges from typical expectations of women artists of the time by aiming for an unvarnished appearance. One such example is Self-Portrait as an Old Woman (1746), whose mismatched eyes hint at the eye problems which plagued her in later life.

Carriera was not just a portrait painter, even though that was her subject matter of choice due to her profession. She also created a few allegorical pieces, including The Four Seasons, The Four Elements and The Four Continents. These allegories were represented by beautiful, nymph like and barely clothed women holding symbols that referenced the meaning of the piece.

=== Art market ===
In September 2025 a Cambridge auction house achieved an unexpected record sum of £508,000 for a 1724 portrait by Carriera of Huntingdonshire MP, Coulson Fellowes. The work in pastel had remained in a private collection since it was created 301 years earlier. It was recorded in Carriera's diary and executed during the sitter's Grand Tour, 1723-25.

== Gallery ==
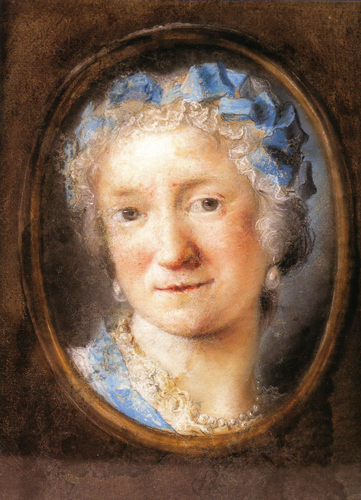
Self-portrait

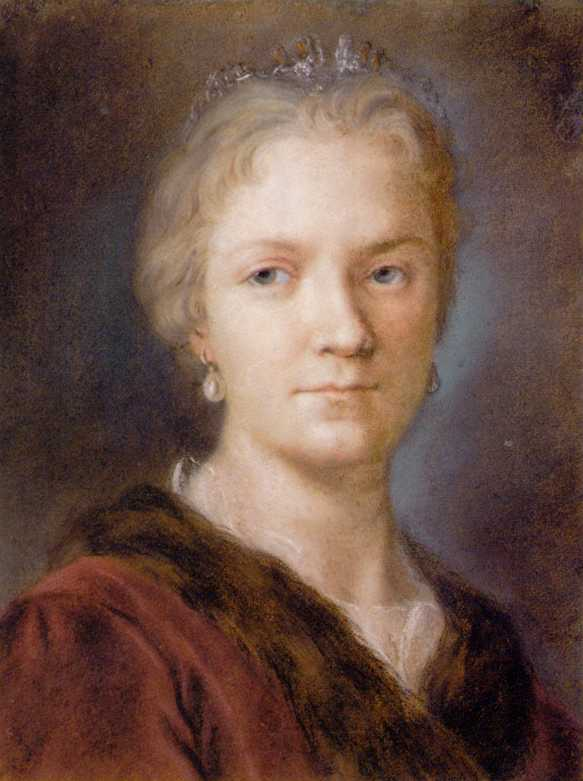
Self-portrait

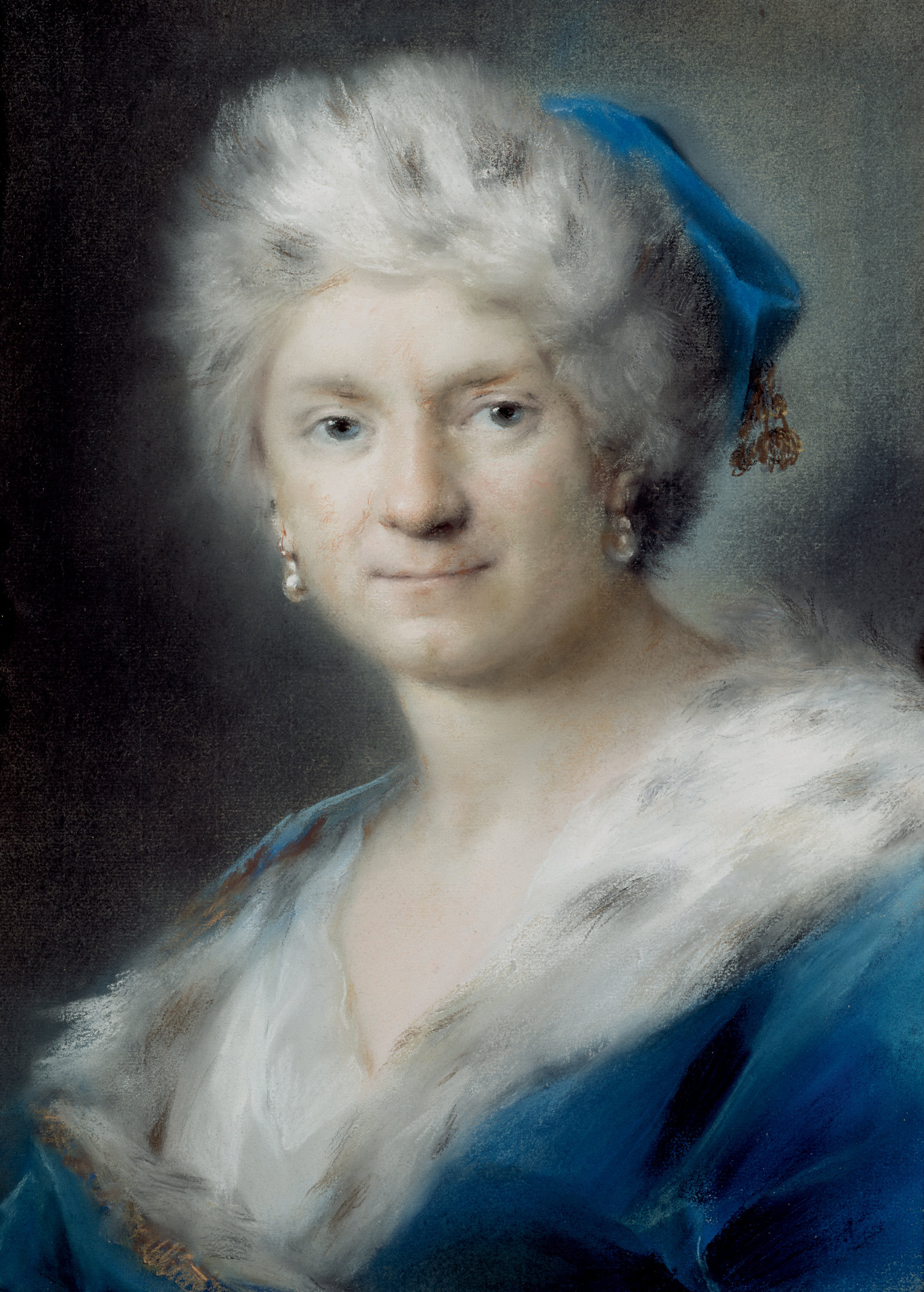
Self Portrait as Winter in ermine fur

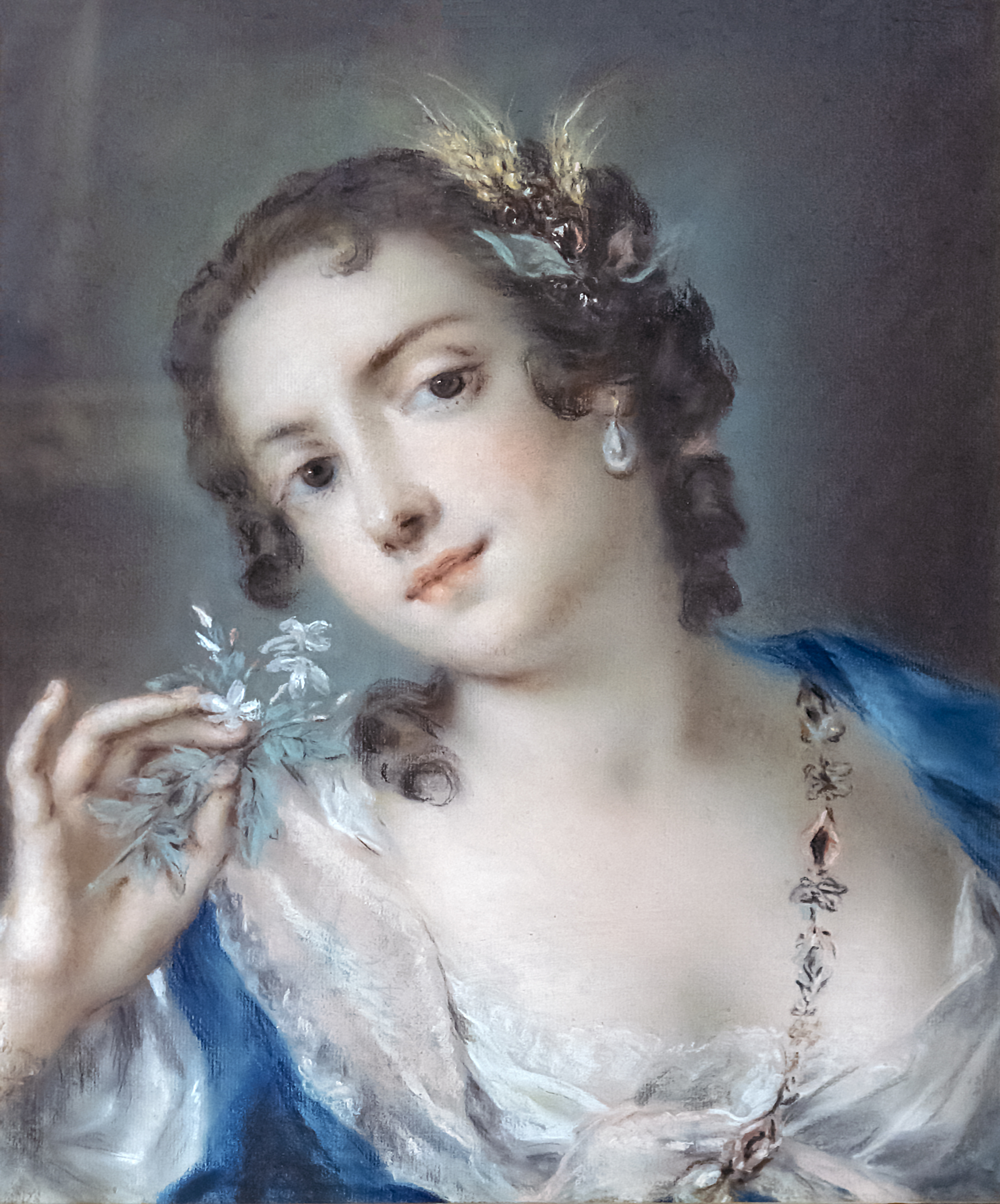
Summer

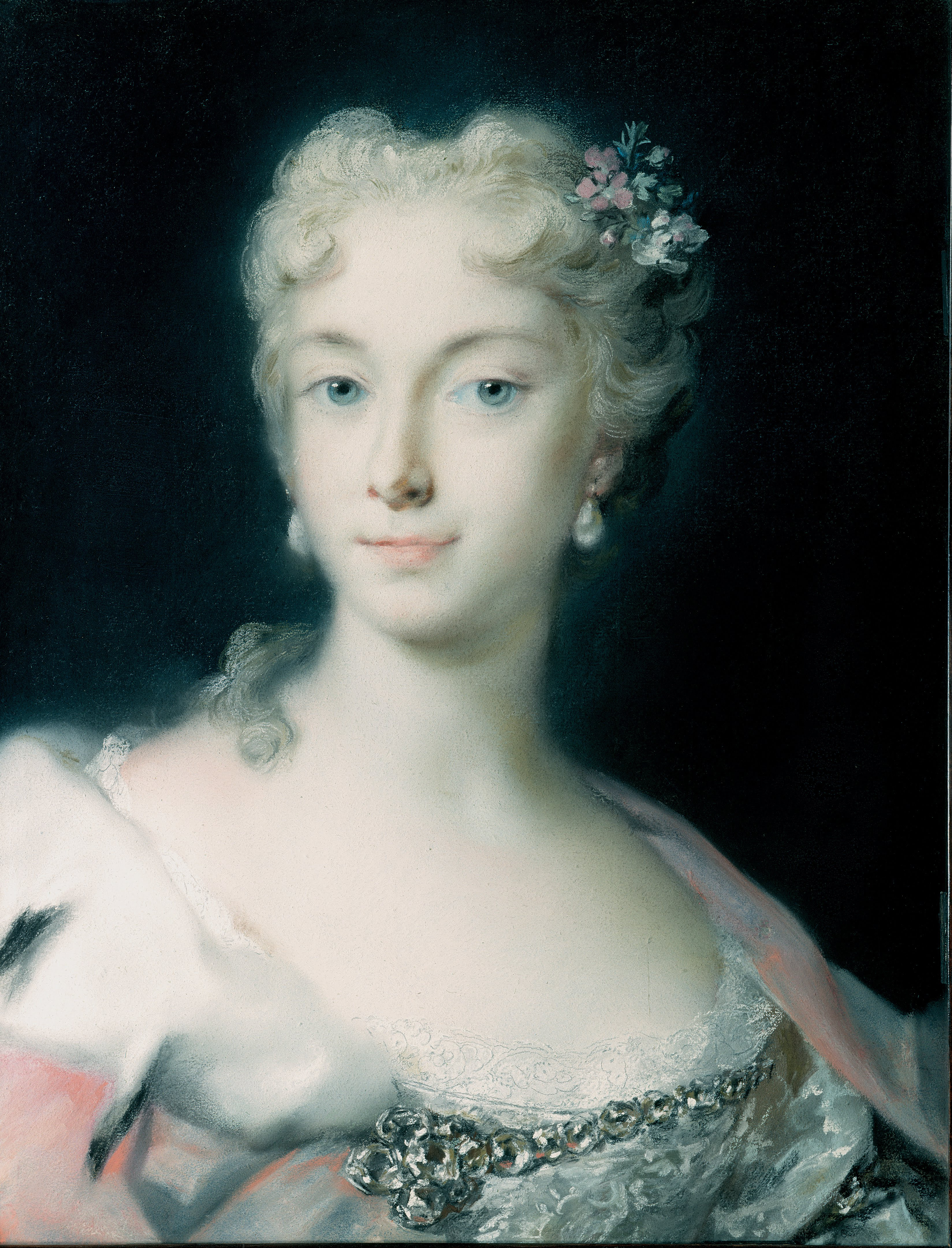
Maria Theresa

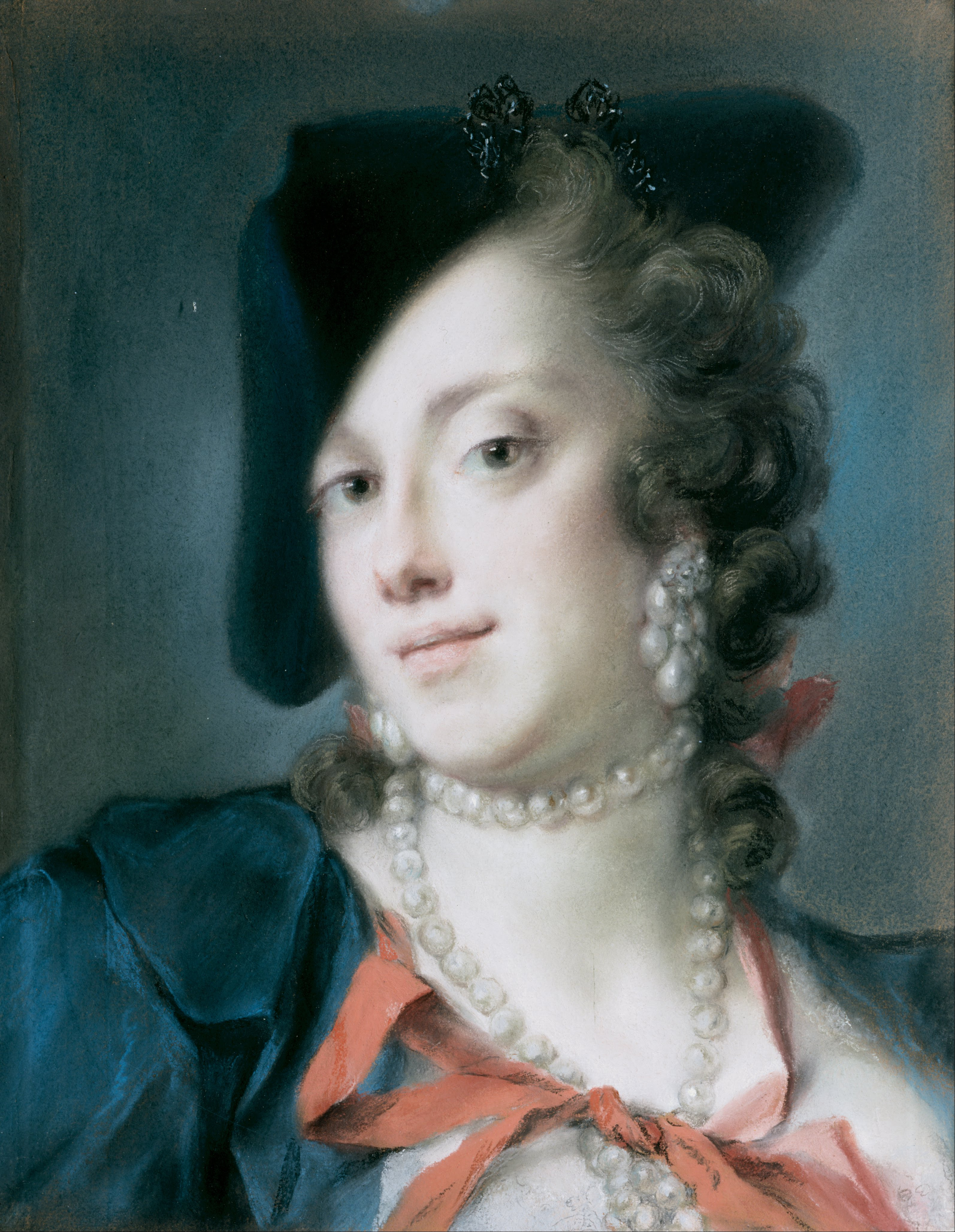
Caterina Sagredo Barbarigo, Gemäldegalerie Alte Meister (Dresden)

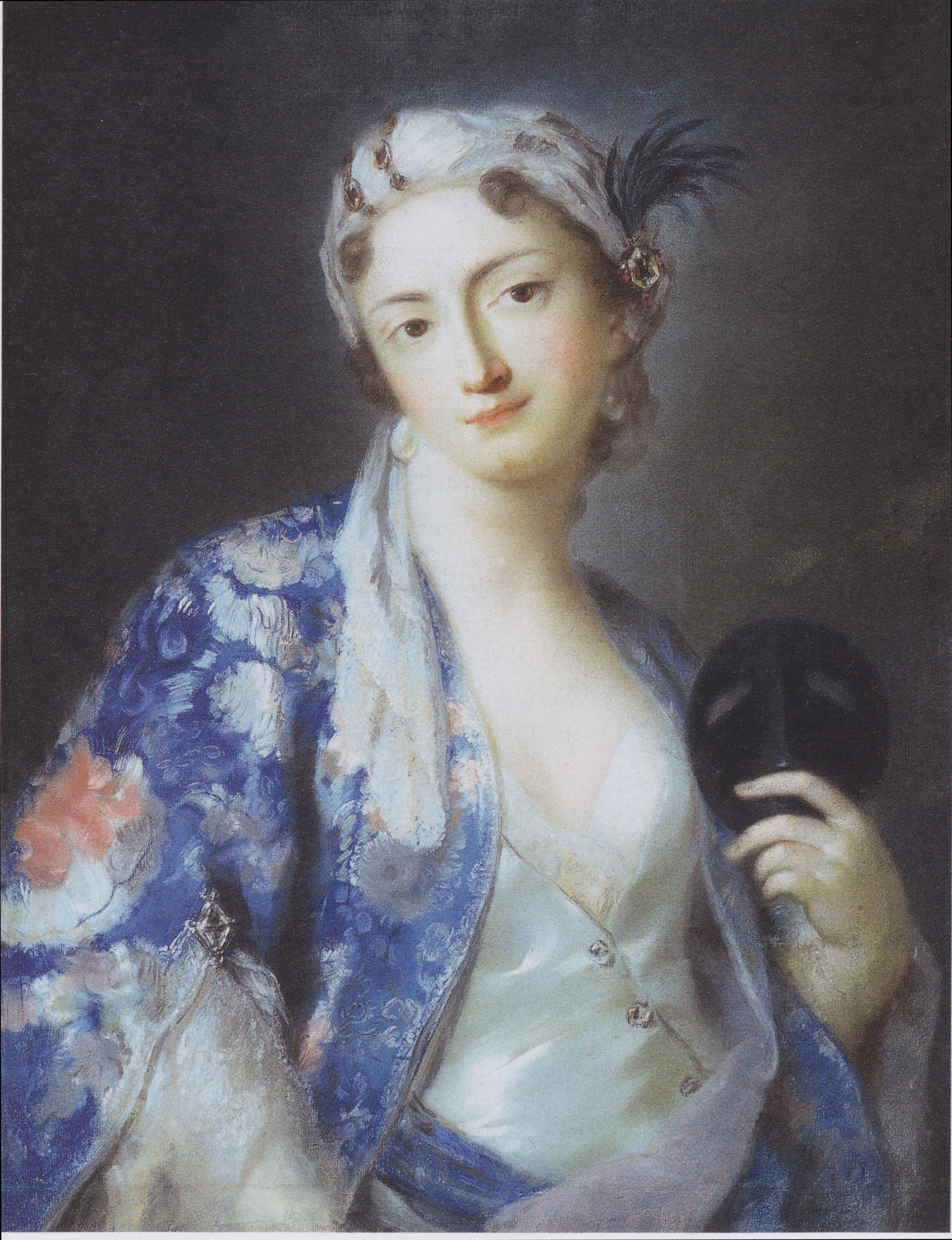
Felicità Sartori in Turkish costume

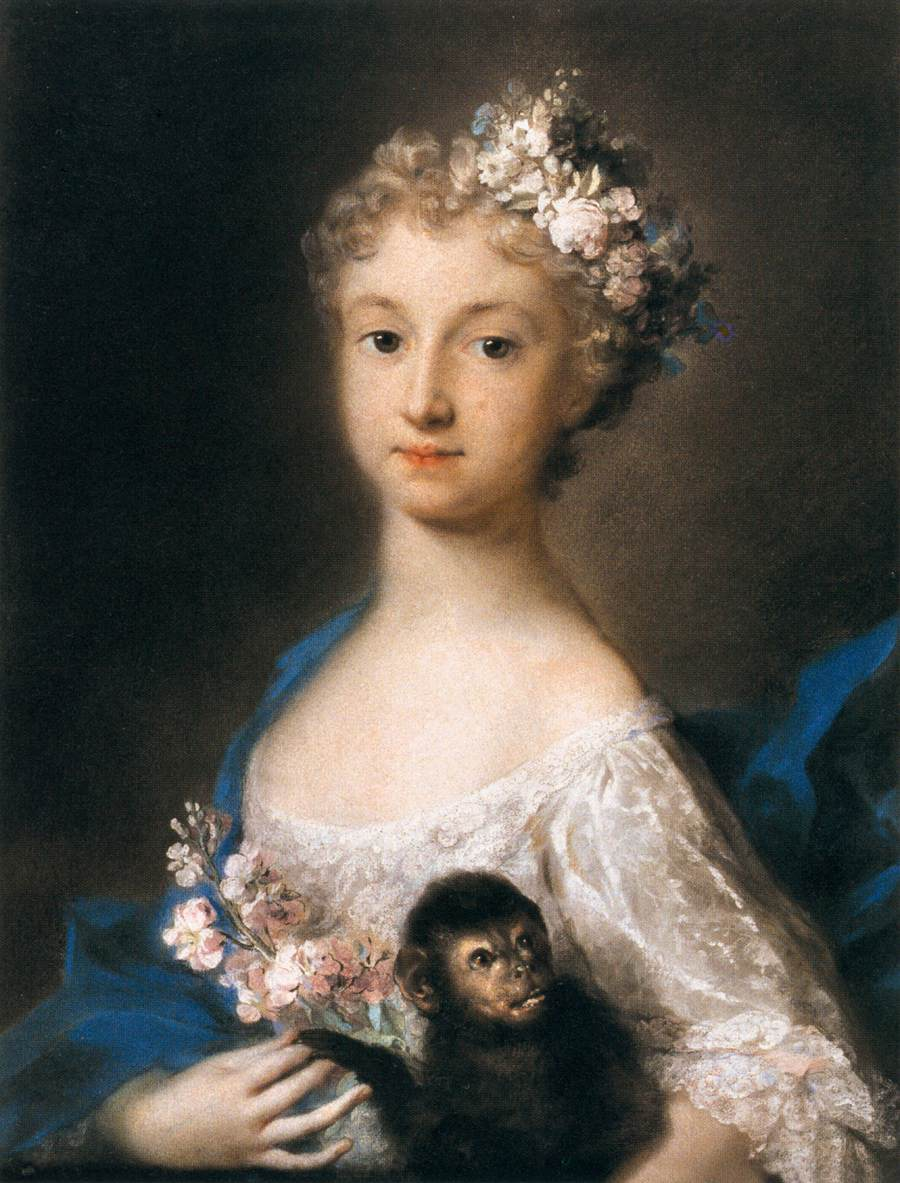
Young Girl Holding a Monkey

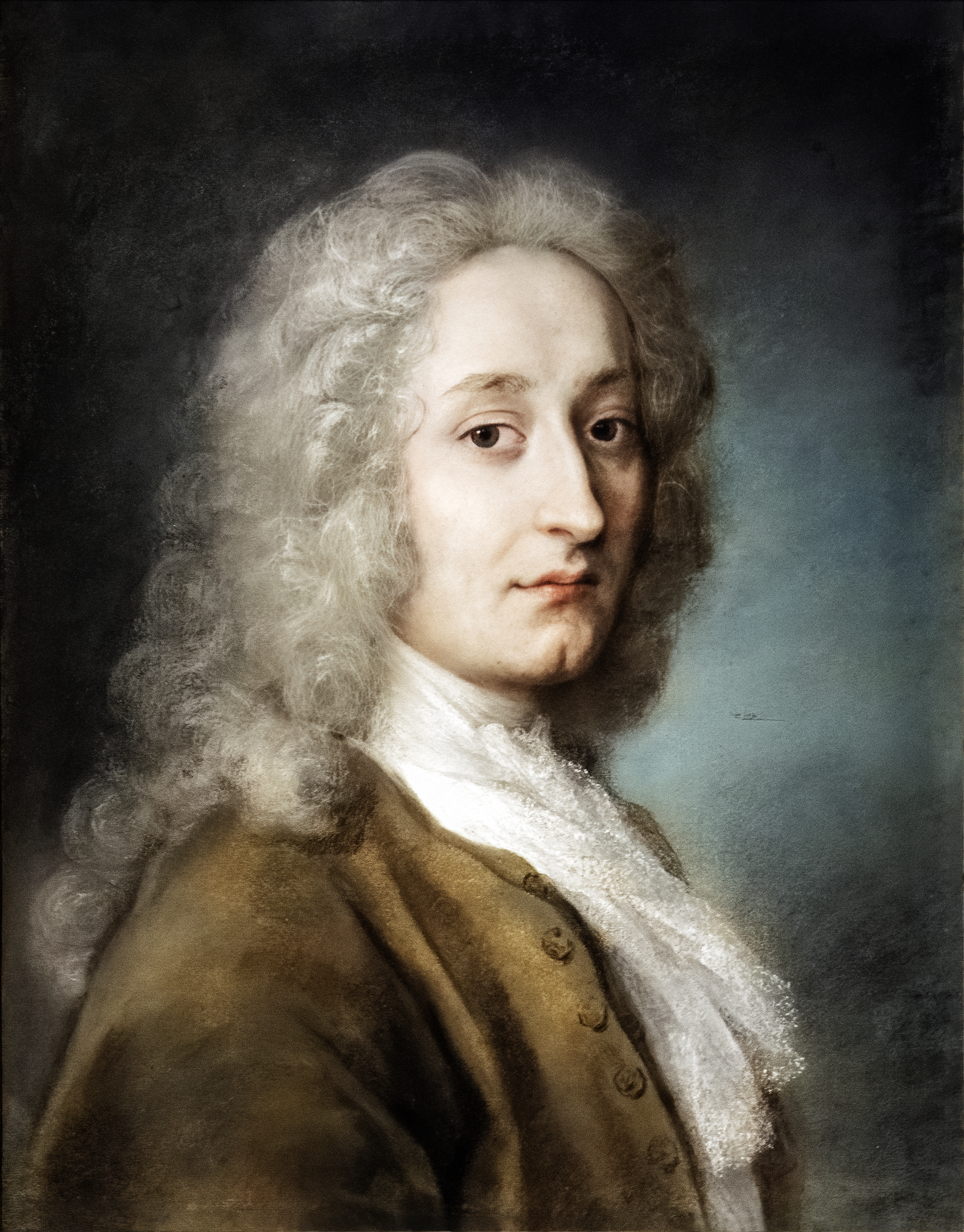
Antoine Watteau

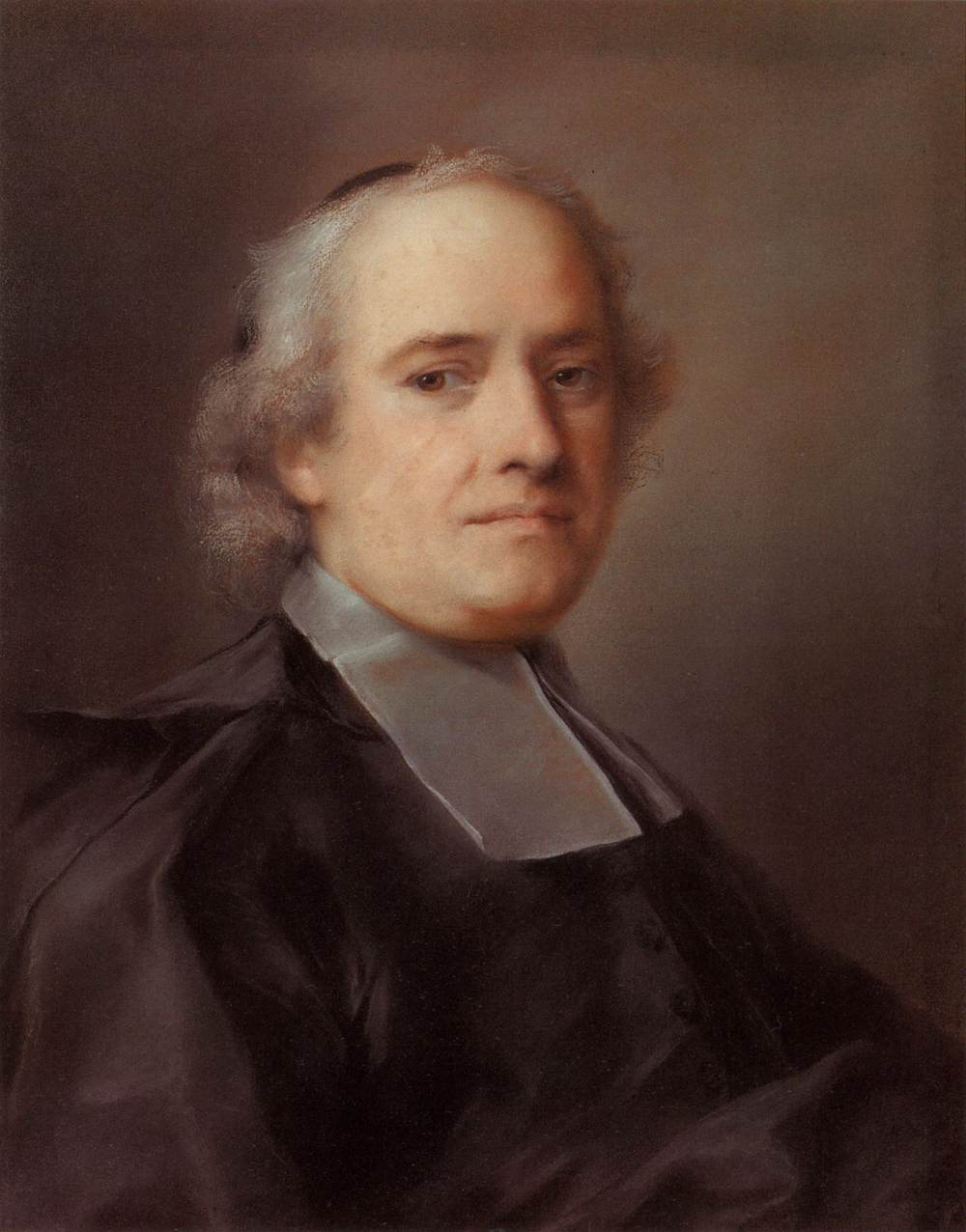
French Consul Le Blond

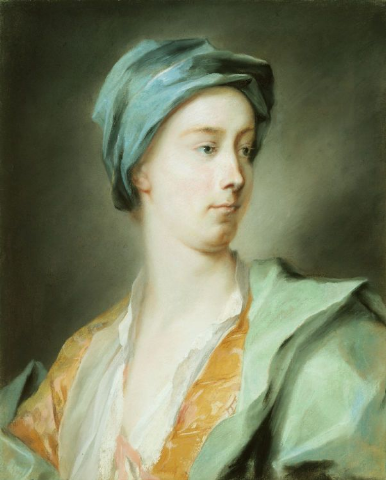
Philip Wharton, 1st Duke of Wharton

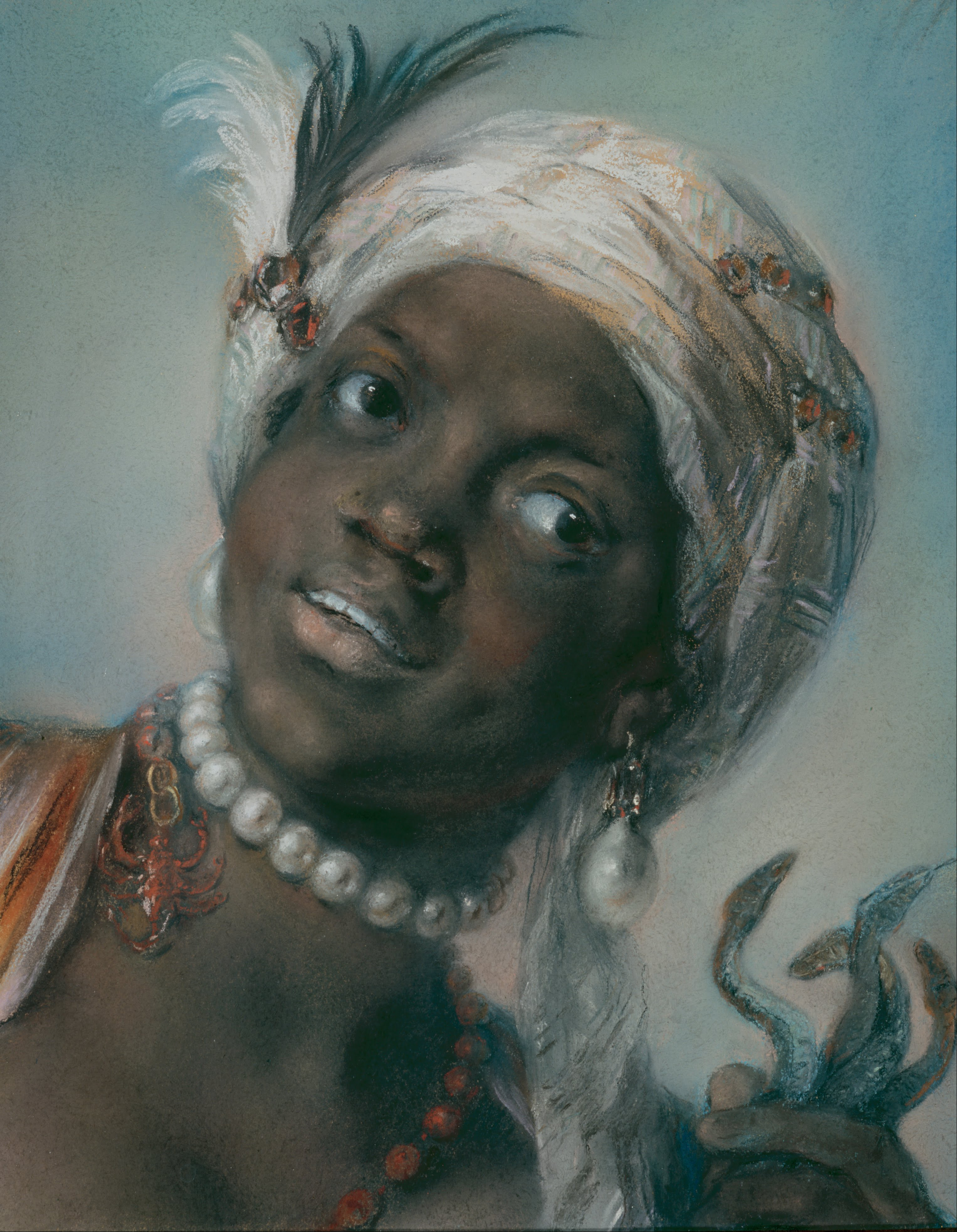
Personification of Africa, Gemäldegalerie Alte Meister, Dresden

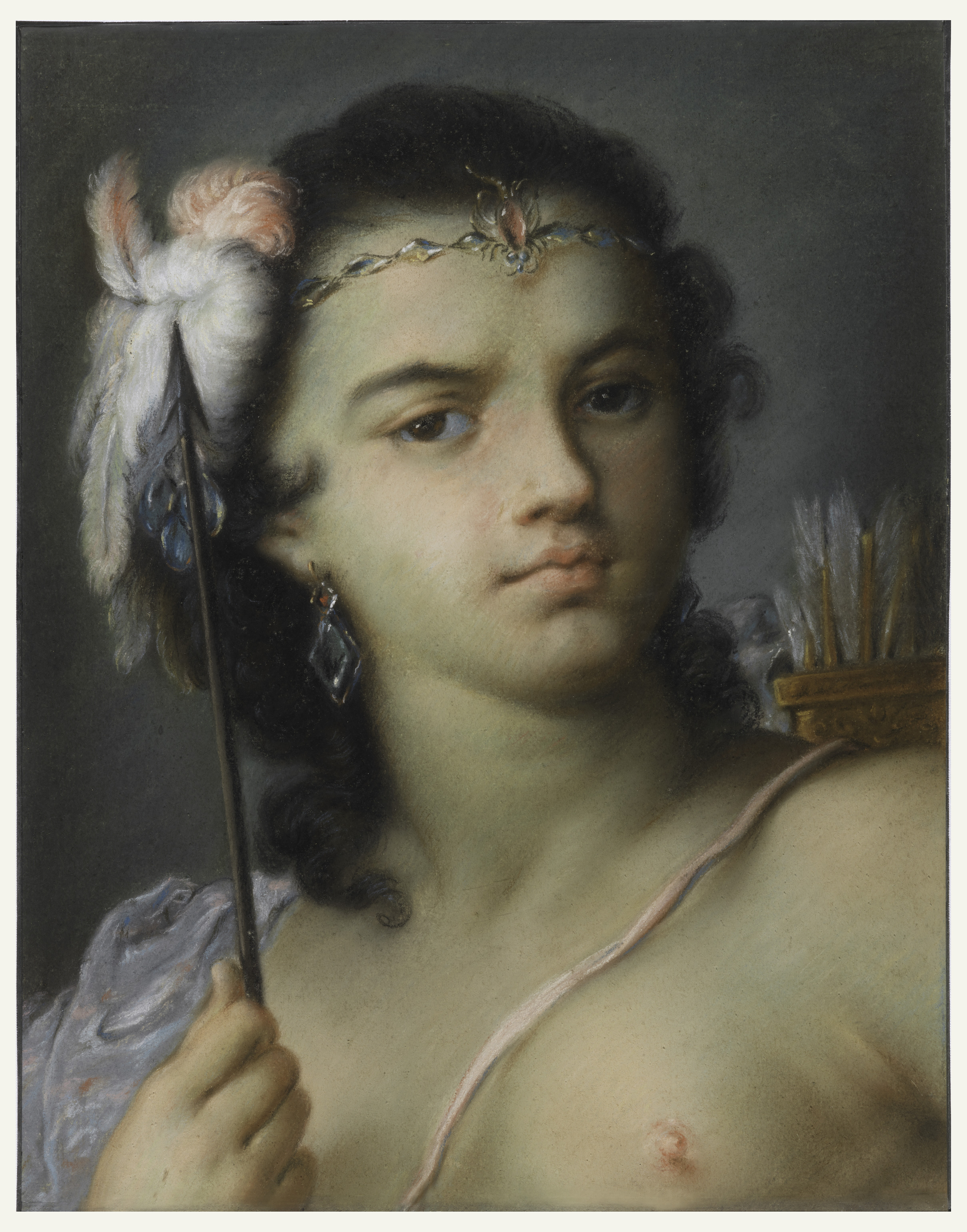
Personification of America, Cooper–Hewitt Museum, New York

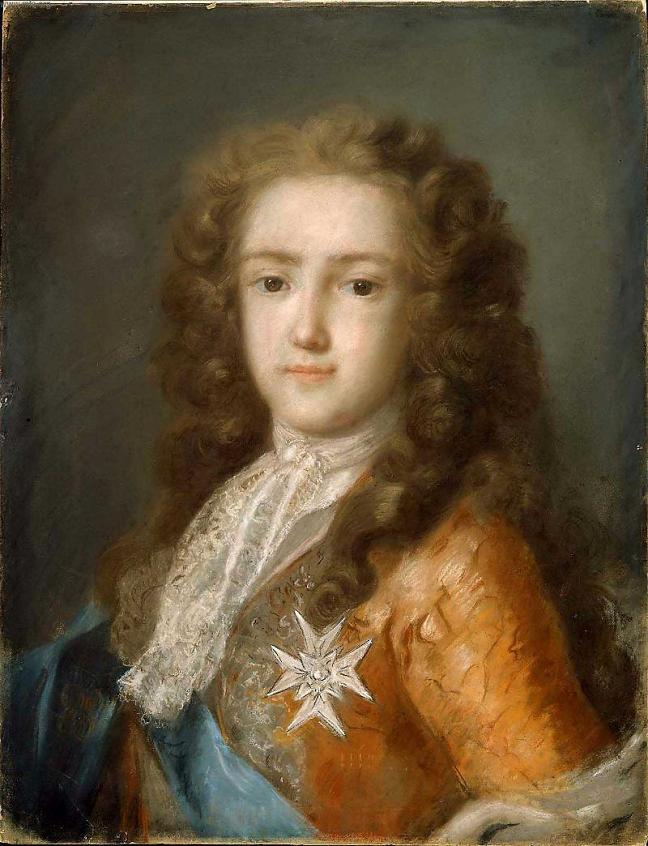
Louis XV

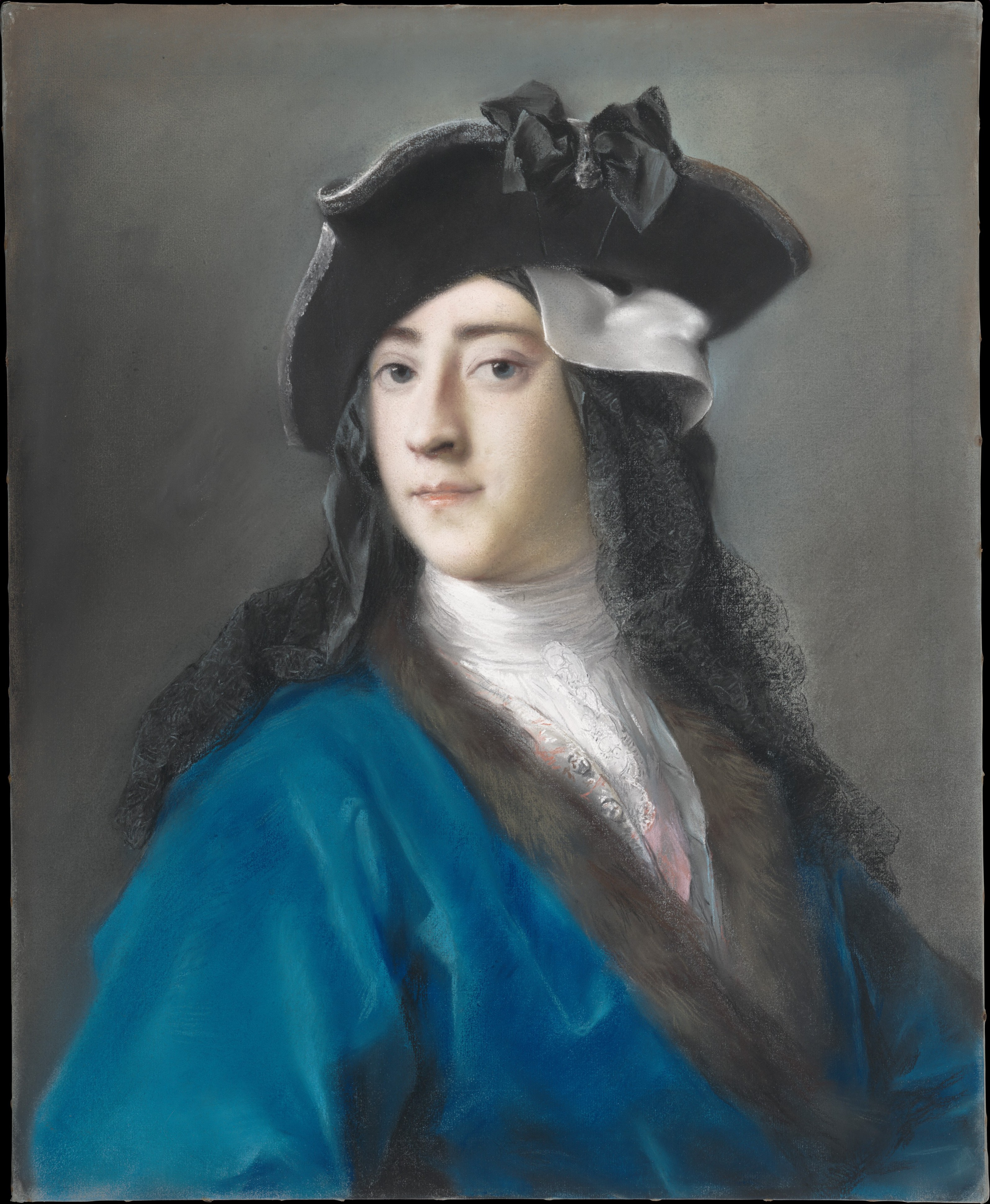
Gustavus Hamilton, 2nd Viscount Boyne

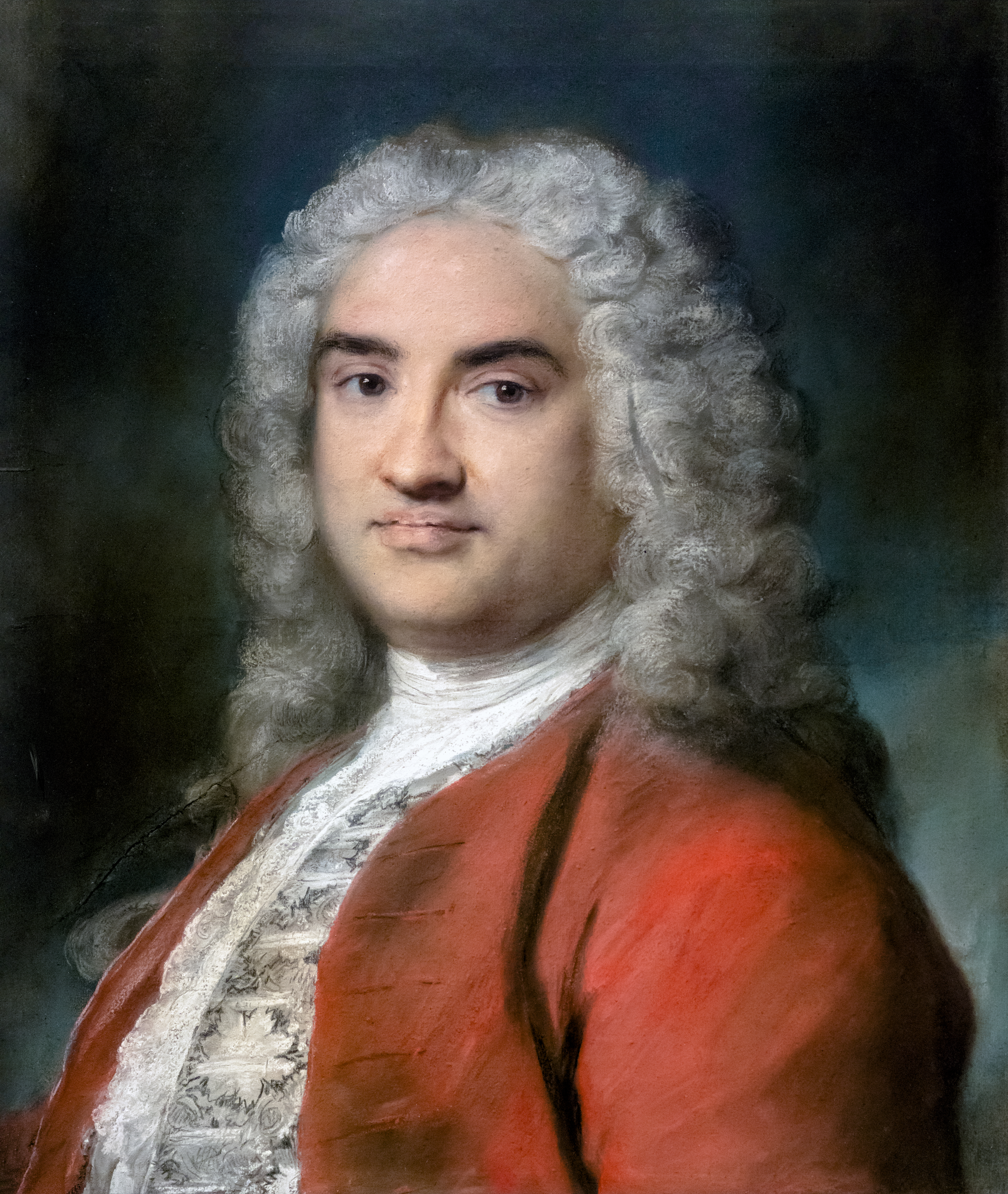
Gentleman in Red

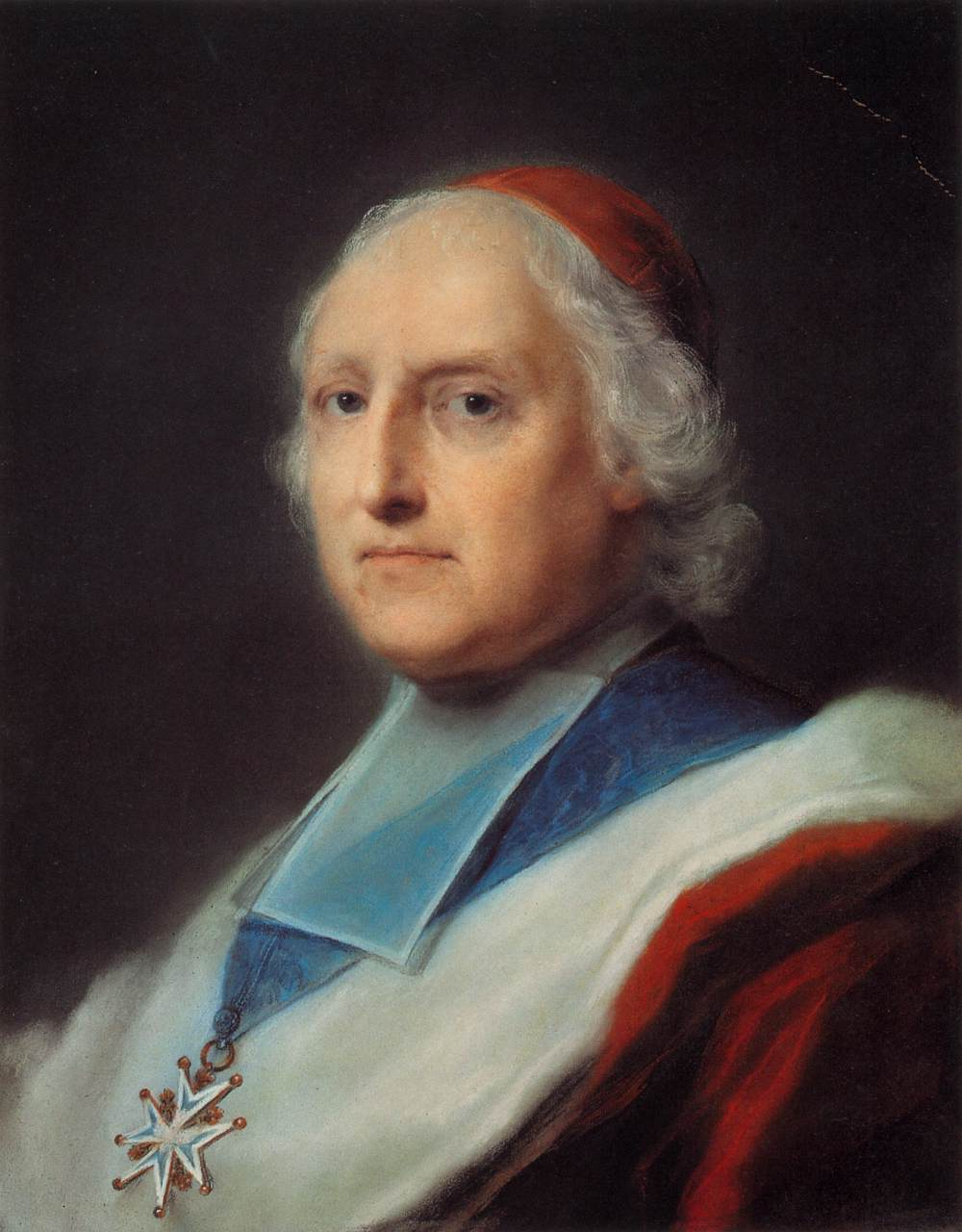
Cardinal Melchior de Polignac

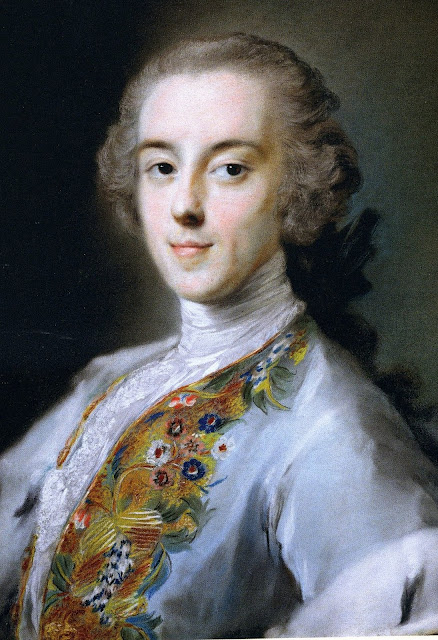
Horace Walpole

Giovanni Poleni

== Legacy ==
Carriera was best known for her innovative approach to pastels, which had previously been used for informal drawings and preparatory sketches. She was also credited with pastel as a medium for serious portraiture that redefined the Rococo manner.

Rosalba Carriera is a character in the novel The Laws of Time (2019) by Andrea Perego.

== Resources ==
- Consult the biographies of Sensier, with translation of her diary (Paris. 1865), Von Hoerschelmann (Leipzig, 1908), and Malamani (Milan, 1910).
- Elsa Honig Fine puts Rosalba Carriera in context with other women artists in Women and Art: A History of Women Painters and Sculptors from the Renaissance to the 20th Century (London & Montclair, 1978).
- Sensier's (highly annotated) version of her journal of two years in Paris (1720–1721) is available from two sources on-line in French:
  - Journal de Rosalba Carriera pendant son séjour à Paris en 1720 et 1721 / publié en italien par Vianelli; trad., annoté et augm. d'une biographie et de documents inédits sur les artistes et les amateurs du temps, par Alfred Sensier: J. Techener (Paris) 1865
  - Rosalba Carriera, Alfred Sensier, Journal de Rosalba Carriera pendant son séjour à Paris en 1720 et 1721: Publié en italien par Vianelli. Traduit, annoté et augm. dùne biogr. et de documents inédits sur les artistes et les amateurs du temps 1865, Techener
