= Cultural depictions of Maximilian I, Holy Roman Emperor =

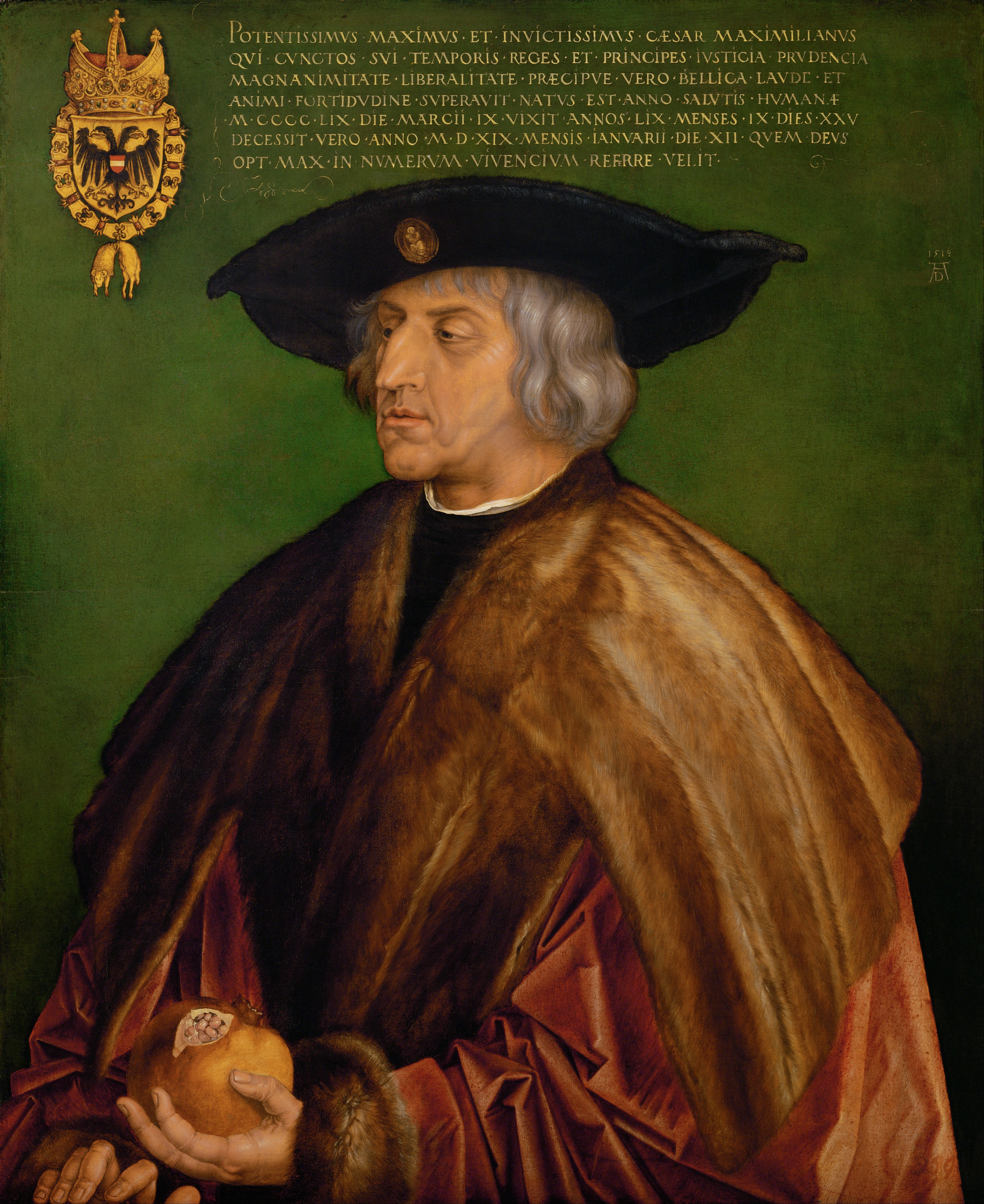
Portrait of Emperor Maximilian I by Albrecht Dürer, 1519, in the last year of his life, holding his personal emblem, a pomegranate.

Maximilian I (22 March 1459 – 12 January 1519) was Holy Roman Emperor from 1508 until his death.

Maximilian was an ambitious leader who was active in many fields and lived in a time of great upheaval between the Medieval and Early Modern worlds. Maximilian's reputation in historiography is many-sided, often contradictory: the last knight or the first modern foot soldier and "first cannoneer of his nation"; the first Renaissance prince (understood either as a Machiavellian politician or omnicompetent, universal genius) or a dilettante; a far-sighted state builder and reformer, or an unrealistic schemer whose posthumous successes were based on luck, or a clear-headed, prudent statesman. While Austrian researchers often emphasize his role as the founder of the early modern supremacy of the House of Habsburg or founder of the nation, debates on Maximilian's political activities in Germany as well as international scholarship on his reign as Holy Roman Emperor often centre on the Imperial Reform. In the Burgundian Low Countries (and the modern Netherlands and Belgium), in scholarly circles as well as popular imagination, his depictions vary as well: a foreign tyrant who imposed wars, taxes, high-handed methods of ruling and suspicious personal agenda, and then "abandoned" the Low Countries after gaining the imperial throne, or a saviour and builder of the early modern state. Jelle Haemers calls the relationship between the Low Countries and Maximilian "a troubled marriage".

In his lifetime, as the first ruler who exploited the propaganda potential of the printing press, he attempted to control his own depictions, although various projects (called Gedechtnus) that he commissioned (and authored in part by him in some cases) were only finished after his death. Various authors refer to the emperor's image-building programs as "unprecedented". Historian Thomas Brady Jr. remarks that Maximilian's humanists, artists, and printers "created for him a virtual royal self of hitherto unimagined quality and intensity. They half-captured and half-invented a rich past, which progressed from ancient Rome through the line of Charlemagne to the glory of the house of Habsburg and culminated in Maximilian's own high presidency of the Christian brotherhood of warrior-kings."

Additionally, as his legends have many spontaneous sources, the Gedechtnus projects themselves are just one of the many tributaries of the early modern Maximiliana stream. Today, according to Elaine C.Tennant, it is impossible to determine the degree modern attention and reception to Maximilian (what Tennant dubs "the Maximilian industry") are influenced by the self-advertising program the emperor set in motion 500 years ago. According to historian Thomas Martin Lindsay, the scholars and artists in service of the emperor could not expect much financial rewards or prestigious offices, but just like the peasantry, they genuinely loved the emperor for his romanticism, amazing intellectual versatility and other qualities. Thus, he "lives in the folk-song of Germany like no other ruler does." Maximilian Krüger remarks that, although the most known of all Habsburgs, and a ruler so markedly different from all who came before him and his contemporaries, Maximilian's reputation is fading outside of the scientific ivory tower, due to general problems within German education and a culture self-defined as post-heroic and post-national.

== Legends and anecdotes ==
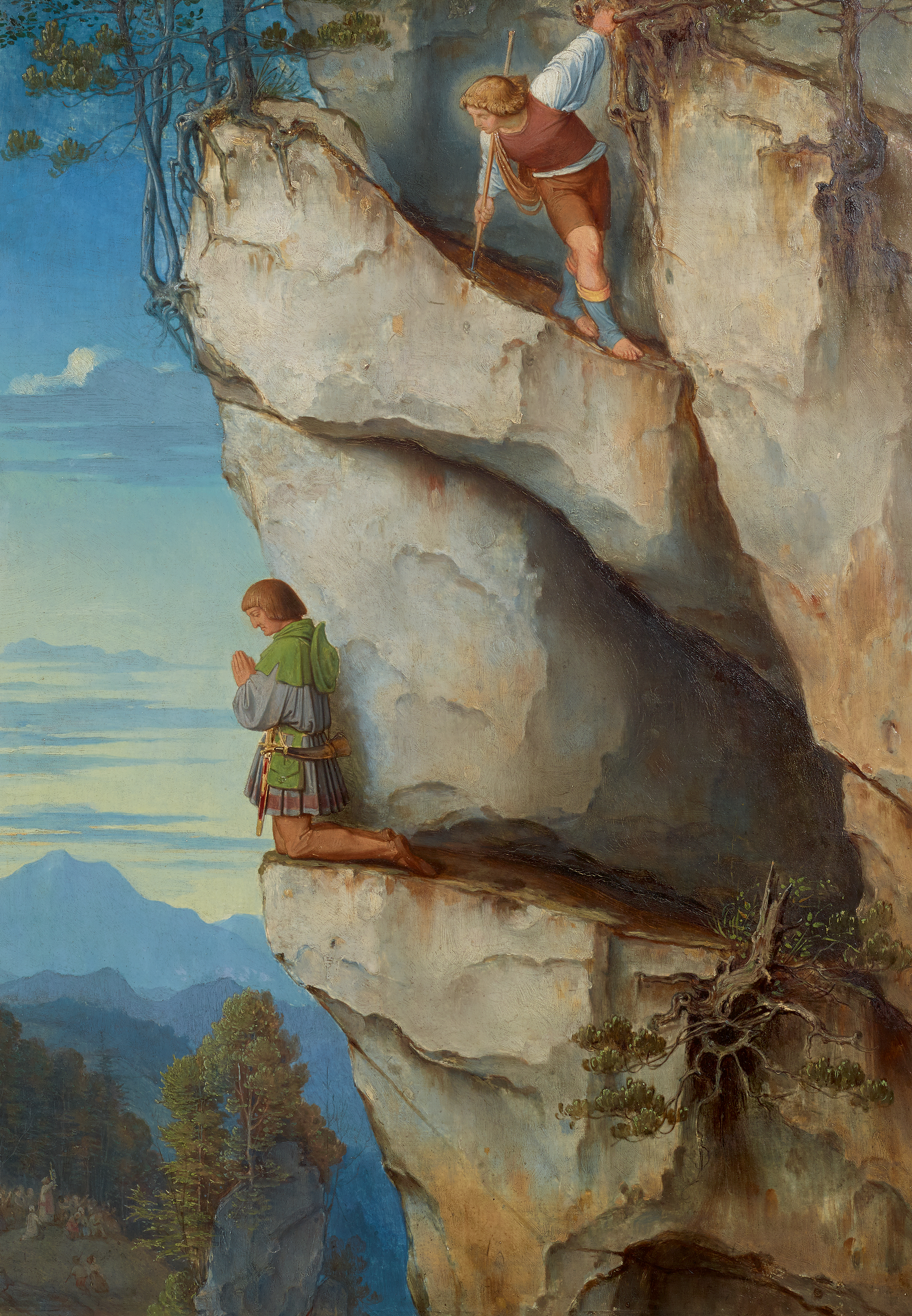
Moritz von Schwind's Kaiser Maximilian I. in der Martinswand, the depiction most known today regarding the Martinswand legend.

Maximilian is the subject of several legends and anecdotes, which themselves would later produce inspirations for artworks.

- The Faust legend: The legend is strongly based on a legend involving Maximilian, his first wife Mary of Burgundy and the humanist Johannes Trithemius (1462–1516), who was suspected by many to be a necromancer. Through his 1507 account, Trithemius was the first author who mentioned the historical Doctor Faustus. Being summoned to the emperor's court in 1506 and 1507, he also helped to "prove" Maximilian's Trojan origins. In the 1569 edition of his Tischreden, Martin Luther writes about a magician and necromancer (understood to be Trithemius) who summoned Alexander the Great and other ancient heroes, as well as the emperor's deceased wife Mary of Burgundy, to entertain Maximilian. In his 1585 account, Augustin Lercheimer (1522–1603) writes that after Mary's death, Trithemius was summoned to console a devastated Maximilian. Trithemius conjured a shade of Mary, who looked exactly like her likeness when alive. Maximilian also recognized a birthmark on her neck, that only he knew about. He was distraught by the experience though, and ordered Trithemius never to do it again. An anonymous account in 1587 modified the story into a less sympathetic version. The emperor became Charles V, who, despite knowing about the risk of black magic, ordered Faustus to raise Alexander and his wife from death. Charles saw that the woman had a birthmark, that he had heard about. Later, the woman in the most well-known story became Helen of Troy. The story of Maximilian, Mary of Burgundy and the Abbot "Johannes Trithem" later appeared as one of the Grimms' Tales.

Another related story came from Hans Sachs' poem Dem Geschichte Keyser Maximiliani mit dem alchamisten (The story of Emperor Maximilian with the Alchemist), which in turn was based on an incident in the seventh century involving the alchemist Morienus and Sultan Khalif of Egypt. Hans Sachs's story allegedly inspired Goethe's scene at the imperial court in Faust II. The story is as the following: Maximilian is approached in his court in Wels by an alchemist who proposed to show him his art. Later, after the transformation had been completed, the alchemist disappeared, leaving a gold cake of ten measures and a message:

O keyser Maximilian,
Wellicher dise kunst kan,
Sicht dich nochs römisch reich nit an,
Daß es dir solt zu gnaden gahn.

O Emperor Maximilian,
Whoever masters this art
Cannot see, for you or the Roman empire,
That matters will turn out well.

Maximilian then learns that the alchemist was a Venetian and sent by his enemies. The next time the poet returns to Wels, Maximilian has died.

The blooming of the Faustus myth was fuelled by the witch craze of the time.

- There are legends that associate Maximilian with swans in Bruges, the city that had once opposed Maximilian's rule in the Low Countries and held him prisoner for nearly four months. The Belgian and Dutch version, possibly dating from the nineteenth century, recounts that after his liberation, Maximilian forced Bruges to maintain swans as a perpetual remembrance for Peter Lanchals, his counsellor and confidant, who was beheaded by Bruges. The German version, appearing early in a 17th-century edition of the Theuerdank, recounts that Maximilian's faithful jester Kunz von der Rosen tried to save the king, but was attacked and driven away by swans. Another legend related to this episode in Maximilian's life and Kunz von der Rosen is that, Kunz von der Rosen, under a priest's garb, tried to save the king by exchanging place with him, but Maximilian, either knowing that an army was coming to save him, fearing for von der Rosen's life or worrying about his dignity, refused. Anton Petter (1791–1858) painted the scene of von der Rosen trying to free Maximilian in his 1826 work Kunz von der Rosen sucht den Kaiser Maximilian I. aus der Gefangenschaft zu befreien.
- Brugse Zot ("Brugge Fool"): After Bruges's revolt had been subdued, Maximilian forbade the organization of fairs. To appease him, the city organized a conciliatory celebration with merrymakers and fools. When he came, they asked him to allow them to establish a madhouse ('zothuis'). He told them that as their city was full of fools, they could just close the gates of the city and they would have a madhouse already. Brugse Zot became the nickname for people of Bruges and also name of an iconic beer, brewed by the brewery De Halve Maan ("the Half Moon").

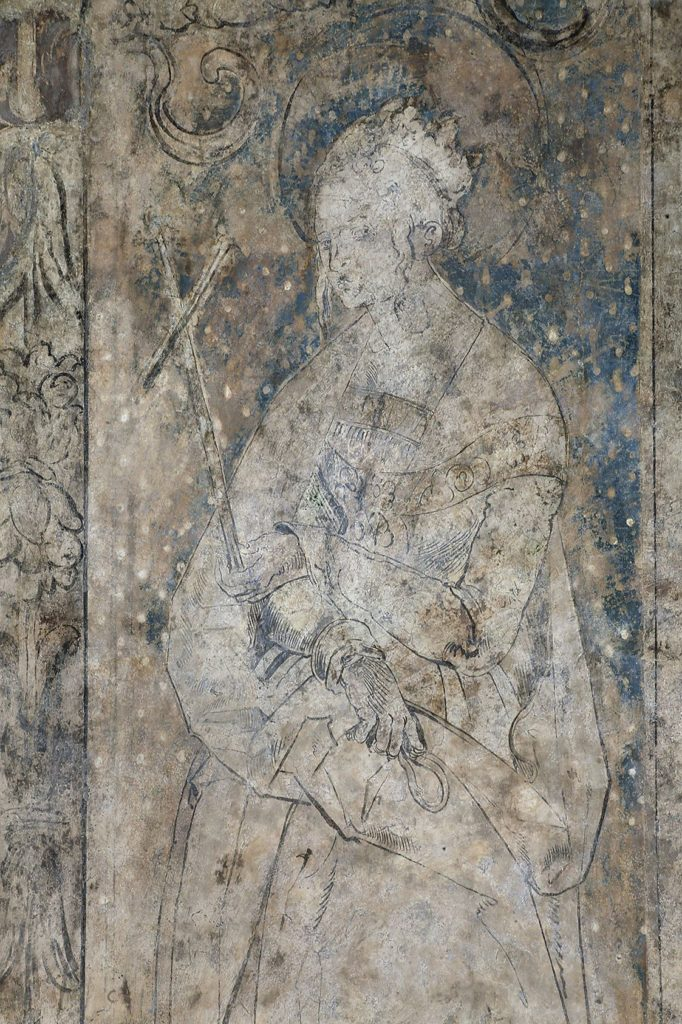
St. Margaret at St. Stephen's Cathedral (mural), Vienna. Now the underdrawing is attributed to Albrecht Dürer (1471 – 1528).

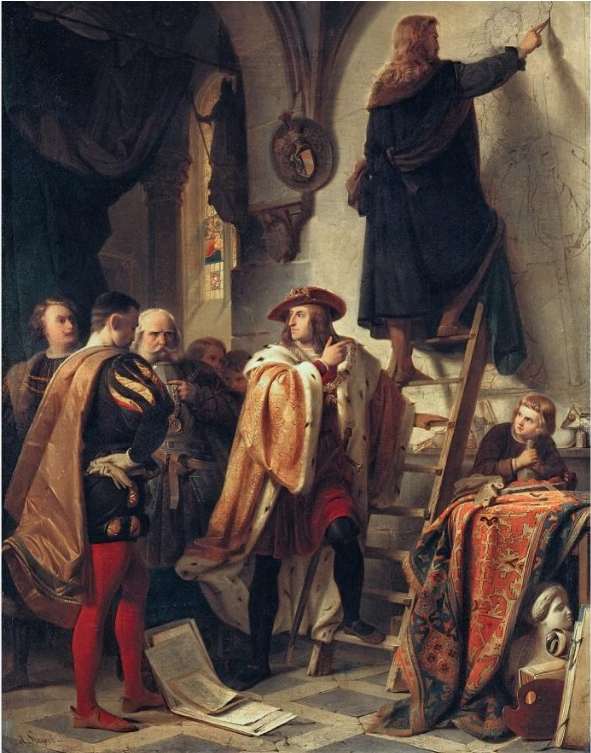
Kaiser Maximilian I. hält Albrecht Dürer die Leiter. By August Siegert, 1849

There are two large murals (created in 2019) in the centre of Bruges, both related to the legend. One is Maria Van Bourgondië (by Jeremiah Persyn), in which Mary of Burgundy is depicted as a Jesus-like figure while Maximilian is in the guise of the Brugge Fool, riding a swan and holding a halfmoon. Another is De Dans der Zotten ("Dance of the fools") by Stan Slabbinck.

- The Martinswand legend: According to this popular saga, the young Maximilian went to hunt chamois at Martinswand, a steep rock wall near Innsbruck, and found himself stuck for three days. A messenger of God or an angel, disguised as a young man in peasant's clothing, then appeared and led him to safely. According to Terjanian, parts this tale appeared during Maximilian's life, but the full version was first presented in the work Hercules Prodicius by the Dutch historian Stephanus Pighius (1520–1604), published in Antwerp in 1587. The episode is depicted in Alfred Rethel's A Guardian Angel Rescuing Emperor Maximilian from the Martinswand (1836); Friedrich Krepp's Die Errettung Kaiser Maximilians I. aus der Martinswand (1849); Moritz von Schwind's Kaiser Maximilian I. in der Martinswand (circa 1860); Lorenz Clasen's Kaiser Maximilian I. in der Martinswand (1873); Ferdinand von Harrach's Kaiser Maximilian I. in der Martinswand (1867); Friedrich Hell (1869–1957)'s Kaiser Maximilian I in der Martinswand; Maximilian's Rettung in der Martinswand on the Fresco Innerkofler Street. In 1936, in the Kaiser-Maximilians-Grotte (Emperor Maximilian Cave, said to be created by Maximilian to commemorate the place he was stuck), a great cross and a statue of the emperor kneeling in front of it were erected by the sculptor Johannes Obleitner. The popular ballad Zyps or Zirl is about this episode.

Franz Schubert wrote the song Kaiser Maximilian auf der Martinswand, based on a text by Heinrich von Collin, about this legend.

- Anecdote of Maximilian holding the ladder for Albrecht Dürer: Dürer was one of the most important artists in the service of Maximilian, whose court leaned towards egalitarianism. One day, Maximilian noticed that the ladder Dürer used was too short and unstable, thus told a noble to hold it for him. The noble refused, saying that it was beneath him to serve a non-noble. Maximilian then came to hold the ladder himself, and told the noble that he could make a noble out of a peasant any day, but he could not make an artist like Dürer out of a noble. The story later became subject of various paintings by nineteenth century painters such as August Siegert (1820–1883), Wilhelm Koller (1829–1884), Peter von Cornelius (1783–1867).

This story and the 1849 painting by August Siegert, shown above, have become relevant recently. This nineteenth-century painting shows Dürer painting a mural at St. Stephen's Cathedral, Vienna. Apparently, this reflects a seventeenth-century "artists' legend" about the previously mentioned encounter (in which the emperor held the ladder). In 2020, during restoration work, art connoisseurs discovered a piece of handwriting now attributed to Dürer, suggesting the Nuremberg master's participation in creating the Viennese murals. In the recent 2022 Dürer exhibition in Nurembeg (in which the drawing technique is also traced and connected to Dürer's other works), the identity of the commissioner is discussed. Now the painting of Siegert (and the legend associated with it) is used as evidence to suggest that this was Maximilian. Dürer is historically recorded to have entered the emperor's service in 1511, and the mural's date is calculated to be around 1505, but it is possible they have known and worked with each other earlier than 1511.

- Erasmus knew several stories about Maximilian, probably from gossips. Erasmus was a member of Charles V's councils. Erasmus and Maximilian's relationship was quite complicated, as they differed on ideological ground, mainly regarding Maximilian's warlike policies (when Guelders invaded the Low Countries in 1517, Erasmus even falsely suspected Maximilian of being in cahoots with other princes to extort money from his subjects). Elsewhere he mentions Maximilian's keenness in judging characters. A story in his Colloquies tells how a young nobleman collected fifty thousand florins in tax but returned only thirty to the emperor who took it without question. After being induced to force him to explain, the emperor summoned the young man. The young nobleman said he would need to learn such account making skills from the assembled councillors, who were good at that business, first. The emperor smiled and let him go. Such stories added to Maximilian's reputation as a reckless financial manager and his officials as being corrupted (which might have been true).

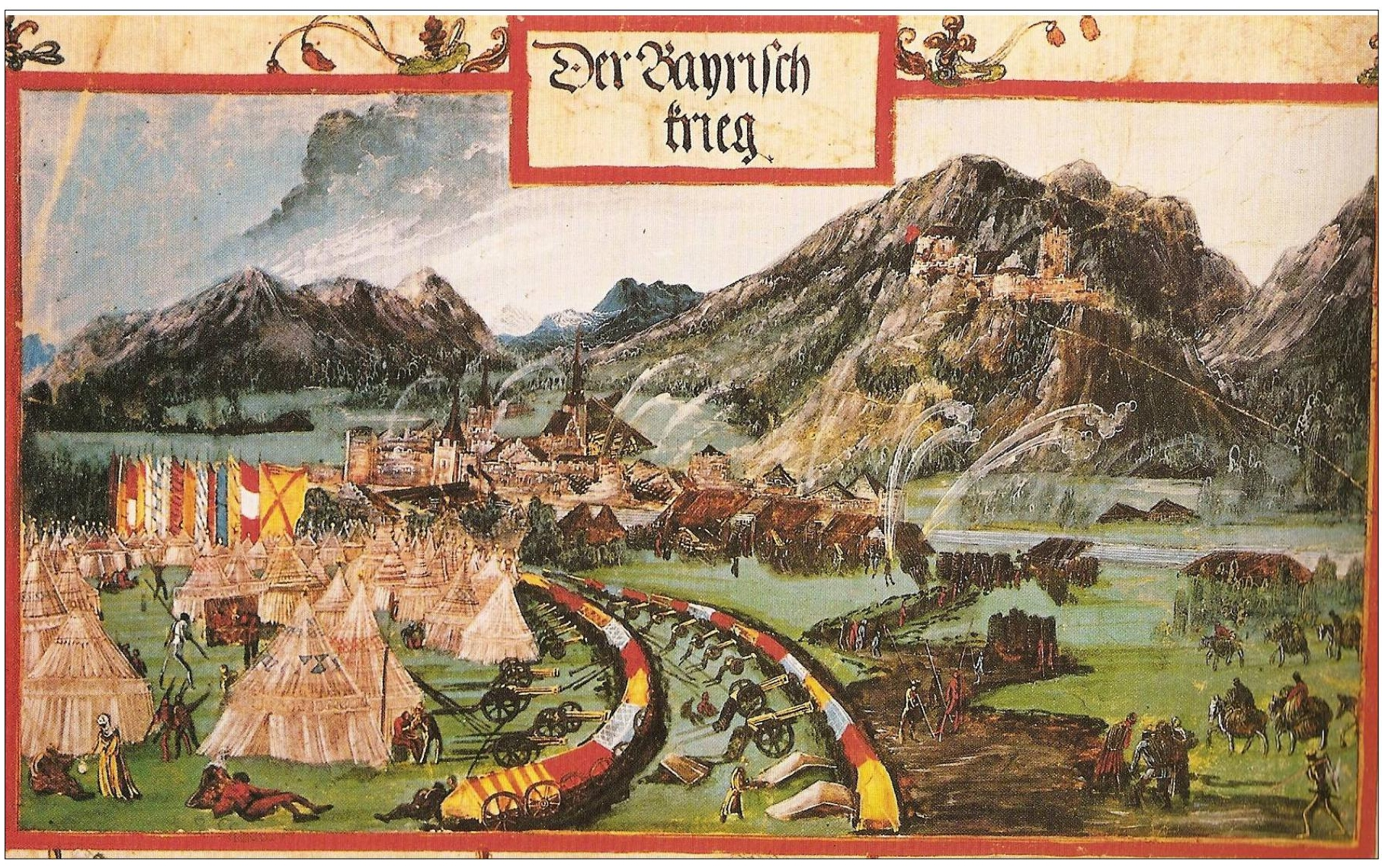
Part of Der Bayrisch krieg (Triumphal Procession), that shows the Siege of Kufstein, Jörg Kölderer.

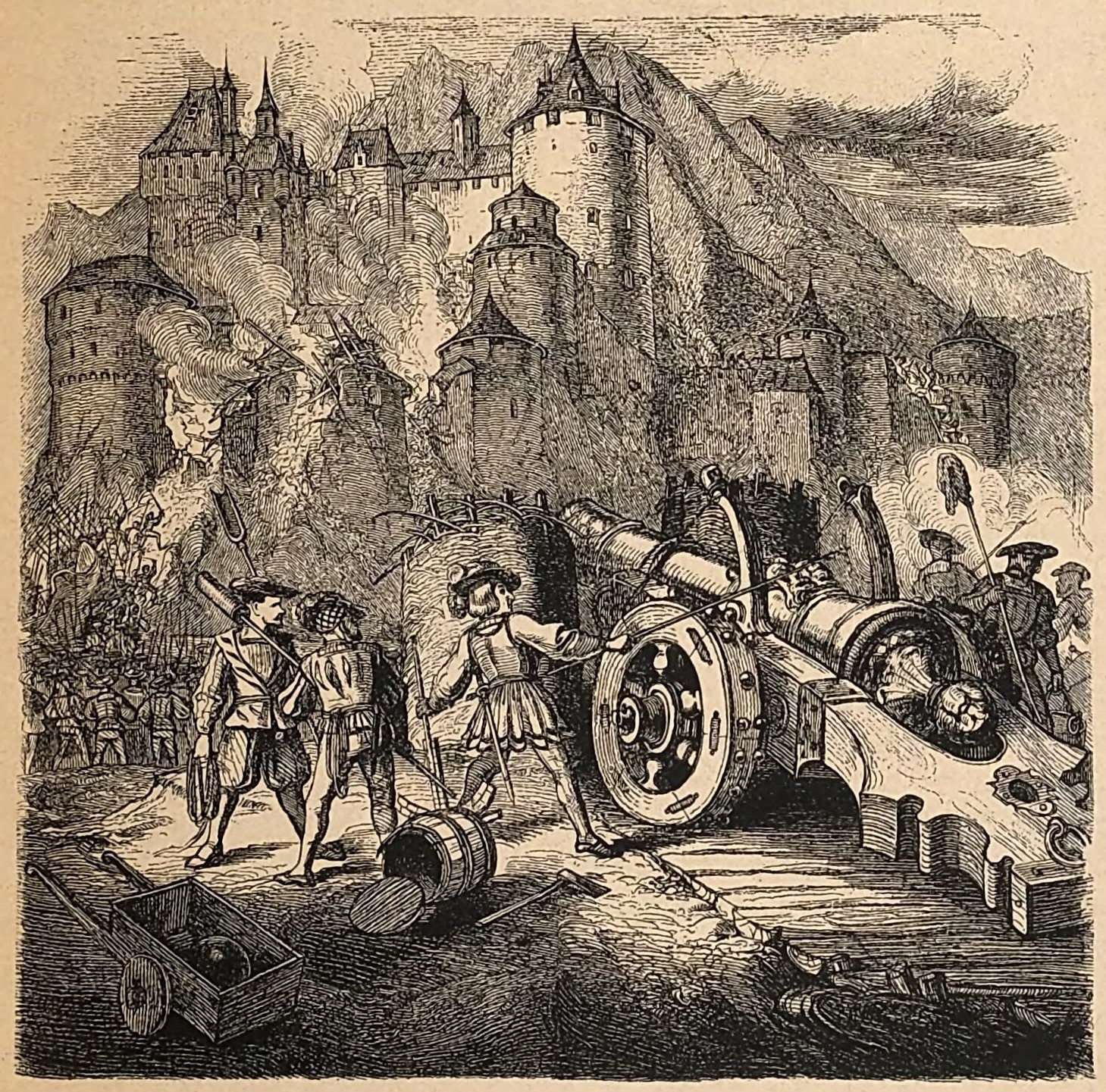
Maximilian firing the cannon Purlepaus himself in the Battle of Kufstein (1504). Illustration from Illustrirte Geschichte der K. K. Armee, Vol.1 (1886), edited by Gilbert Anger.

- In the War of the Succession of Landshut, during the Siege of Kufstein (1504), Hans von Pienzenau fought against Maximilian and his Bavarian allies. Maximilian took the fortress after a fierce artillery attack, with display of some of his latest artillery innovations. Von Pienzenau had sworn loyalty to Maximilian before switching to the Palatinate side, allegedly after being bribed with 30,000 guilders. But the main reason Maximilian became angered was that during the siege, they had refused his offer of surrender and used brooms to sweep up damage caused by his cannons to taunt him. Eighteen including Pienzenau were beheaded before Erich von Braunschweig, a favoured commander, pleaded for the lives of the rest. Maximilian had forbidden any pleading, but Erich had saved Maximilian's life at the Battle of Wenzenbach and was his godchild. After the siege, Maximilian rebuilt Kufstein into a powerful fortress, that still stands today. He added the white, eye-catching Kaiserturm (Imperial Tower), at which there is now a permanent exhibition about him. Now there is also a Ritterfest (knights' festival) in Kufstein that celebrates the memories of both Maximilian and Pienzenau.

The scene is depicted by Johannes Riepenhausen in his Herzog Erich der Ältere von Calenberg und Kaiser Maximilian vor der Veste Kufstein in Tirol (pen-and-ink drawing around 1836; the same artist recaptured the scene in an oil painting in 1837 with Herzog Erich von Braunschweig bittet unter eigener Gefahr den Kaiser Max um Gnade für die zu Kuffstein Verurteilten), On the wall of the nearby Auracher Löchl (the oldest winehouse of Austria), there is a depiction of the "last knight" with his cannon, opposing Hans Pienzenau.

== Works produced during Maximilian's lifetime ==
Maximilian was a major patron of the Renaissance in the North as well as a creative force in his own right, (Note: "Maximilian was in many ways the epitome of his age, the personification of the Renaissance. Soldier and man of letters, administrator and theologian, athlete and scholar, he yet found time to encourage artists and to devise and commission innumerable works of art.") (Note: "Castiglione's courtier was nothing but a scaled down version of the omnicompetent Renaissance prince best exemplified, perhaps, by the Emperor Maximilian I who died in January 1519 [...] Maximilian had often declared that he intended to have 130 books prepared, recording his deeds, accomplishments and ideas for posterity. Only a few works from this massive programme were ever completed: but these, together with those projected, constitute by far the fullest statement of the interests considered apposite to the Renaissance prince. Life and death; the past, present and future — Maximilian's imagination was all-encompassing.") and as such admired and able to maintain a relationship with many important artists and scholars of his time, most notably the humanists who praised him as a second Apollo and Father of the Muses. In the Low Countries, Maximilian was a divisive figure, sometimes represented as the saviour of the country and sometimes as an autocratic tyrant (both possibly historical truths). While his Burgundian supporters (beginning with Molinet) tended to identify him with the Saviour (either in the guise of an eagle or the only begotten Son), Maximilian and his German supporters, especially his closest humanist circle, usually identified himself with Apollo-Phoebus (or the Sun), Hercules, Saint George and some other saints. Hugh Trevor-Roper remarks that in comparison with princes in Italy and Flanders as well as his own descendants, he did not commission great religious pictures. His tastes focused on himself, his family, German and Roman ancient heroes, and certain saints that he considered to have a kinship to his house.

=== Gedechtnus ===
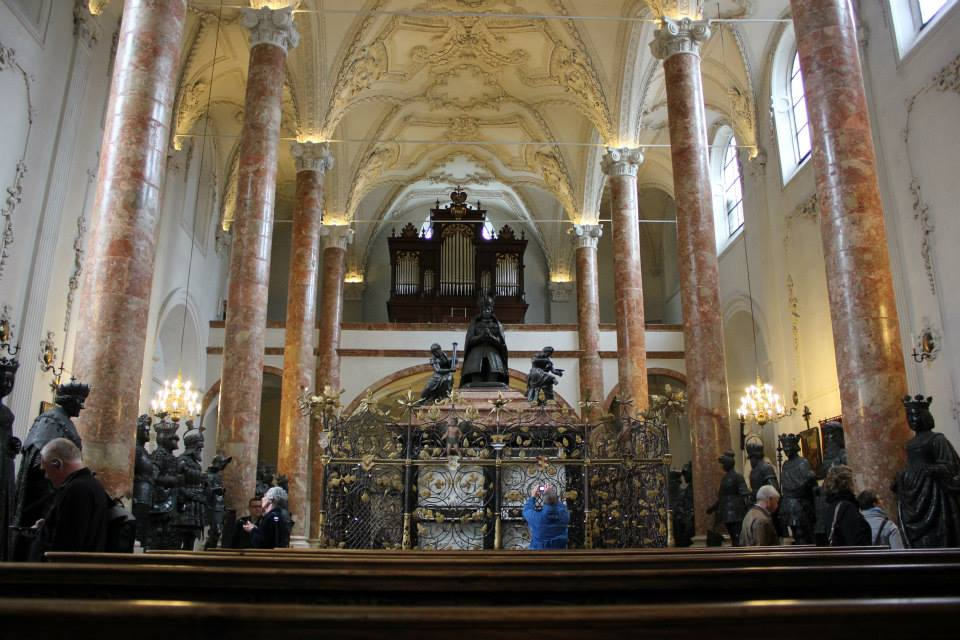
Maximilian's Cenotaph, Innsbruck

Gedechtnus (memorial) is a term used by the emperor to refer to his monumental projects that served to institutionalize and memorialize his image and that of his family. The core of these was his massive autographical (or semi-autographical) corpus, including Theuerdank, Freydal, Weisskunig, the Ehrenpforte (Triumphal Arch), genealogical projects, various triumphal celebrations, architectural projects like his Cenotaph in Innsbruck, musical works by leading composers of the day like Heinrich Isaac and Paul Hofhaimer. Maria Golubeva judges these projects as glorification for posterity, rather than propaganda in the normal sense of the word. Theuerdank and Weisskunig are considered "the last attempt to revive medieval chivalrous ideals." For Theuerdank, Freydal and Weisskunig as well as his Latin autobiography, Maximilian dictated content of chapters, provided sketches, revised drafts and was generally the driving force of these projects himself, although dozens of artists were involved in the creative process. In the cases of the Triumphal Arch and the Triumphal Procession, with the help of Johannes Stabius, he provided the texts on iconography and close supervision. He was the designer of his own Cenotaph.

Watanabe-O'Kelly notes that the projects often made use of luxurious elements, which indicated that they were not intended for the mass. Maximilian issued privileges to printers of such projects, but a number of these works, by their design, "invited reproduction, reuse, appropriation and imitation". Theuerdank (one of the few projects completed in the emperor's lifetime), in particular, quickly became free-for-all, public shareware after its first publication in 1517, pirated initially by printers in the Low Countries.

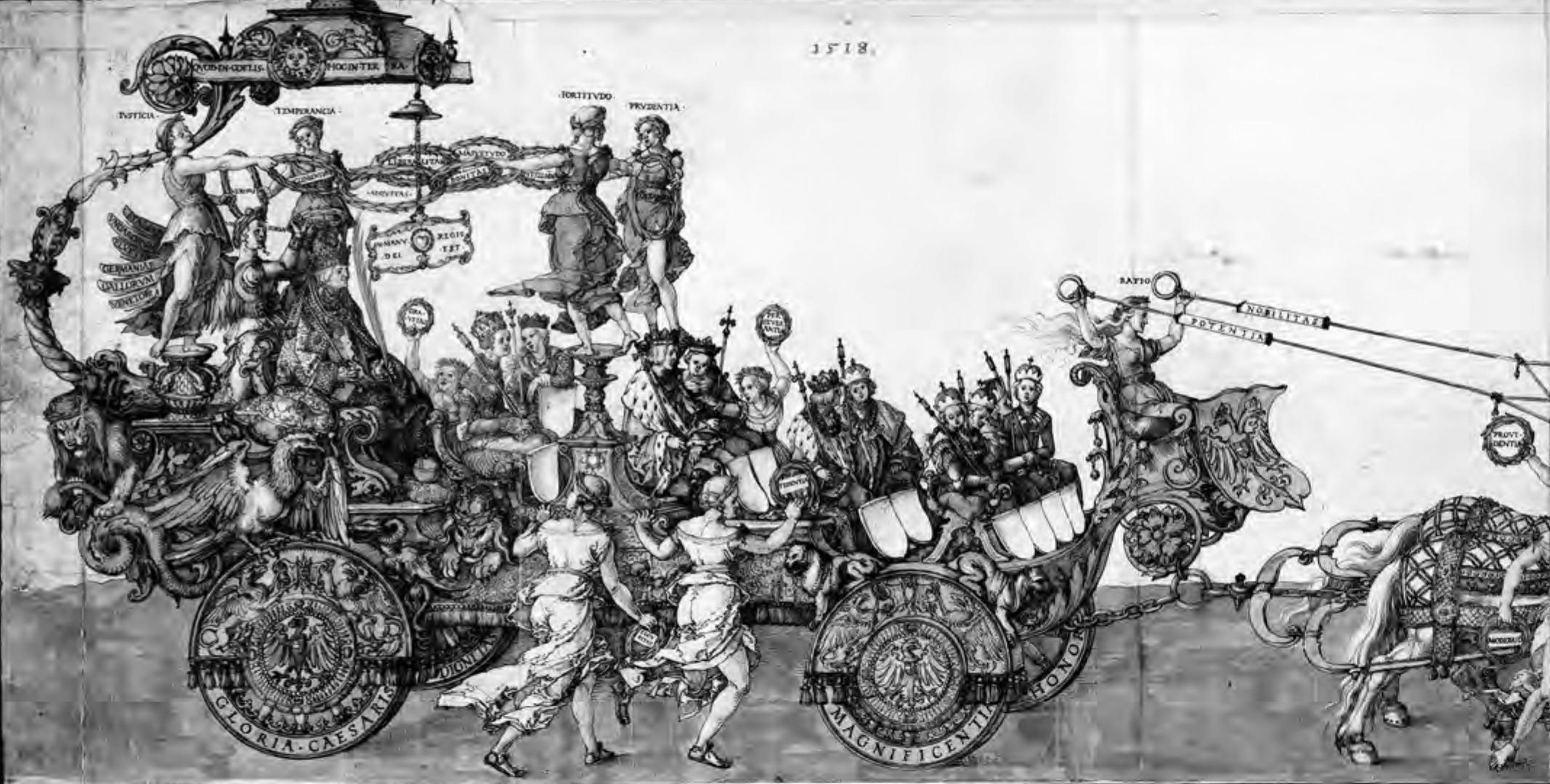
Original design

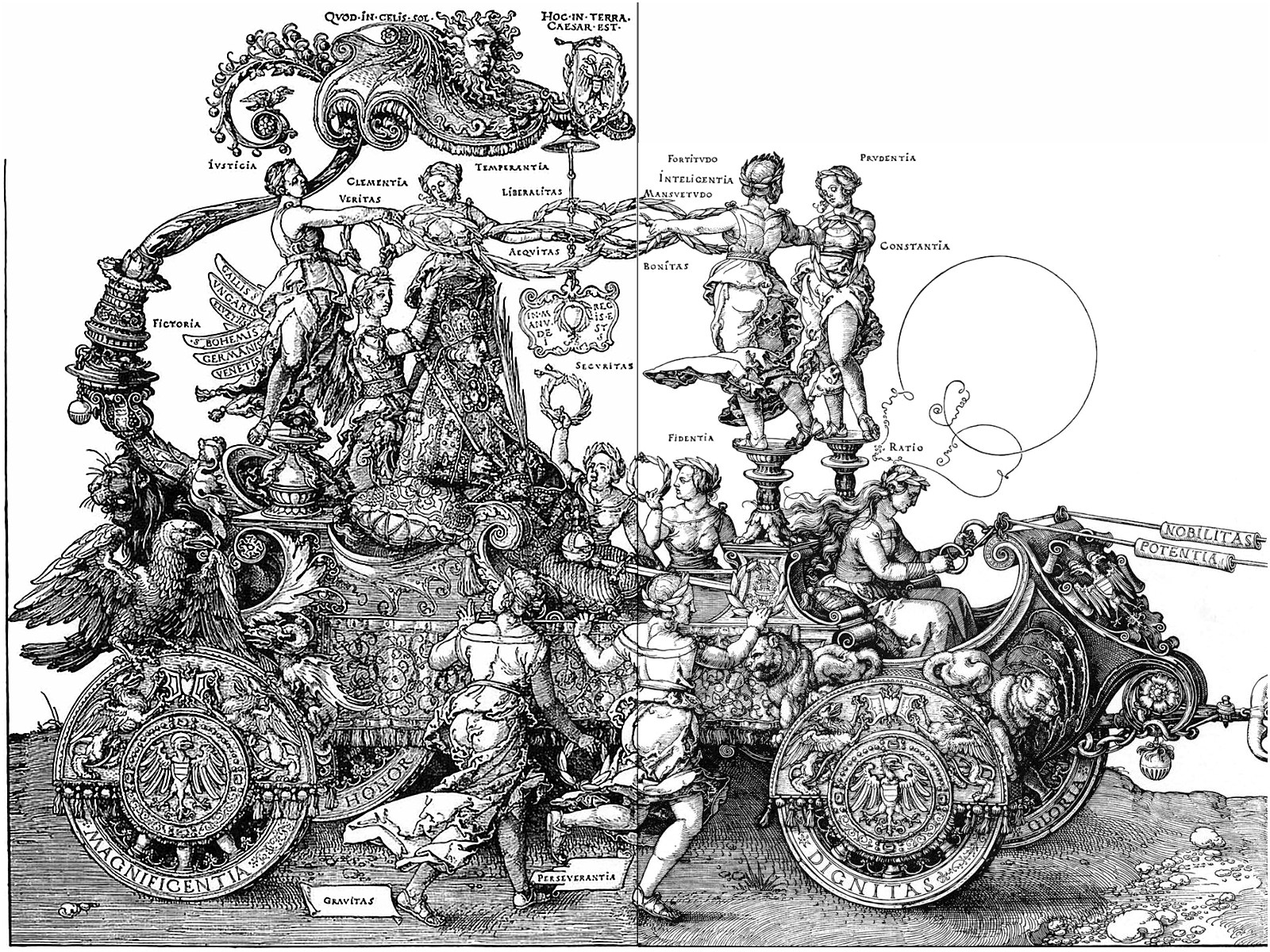
Revised design

Part of the eight-block Large Triumphal Carriage: Dürer's 1518 drawing showed the emperor with his family, but the painter and Willibald Pirckheimer, in a "freelance" effort, decided to show Maximilian alone with the Virtues. The text accompanying the woodcut describes the ruler, as Sol Invictus, a new Alexander and also the sun of imperial virtues, heralding a new era for the nation. The depiction ceased to be glorification of Maximilian's genealogy or even Maximilian as an individual and became glorification of the imperial office and image of the perfect prince instead.

The Triumphal Arch as well as other depictions of triumphal celebrations by the emperor as his artists have been called "the most elaborate imaginary procession designs." According to Jasper Cornelis van Putten, the Triumphal Arch is the most influential genealogical woodcut, following which printed monumental genealogies became popular with European rulers until well into the eighteenth century. It is also "the most celebrated hierographic monument".

Other than the glorification aspect, the emperor, with the help of his artistic advisors, had a habit of inject dark allegories and his inner turmoil into the works.

The genealogical projects and the invented histories that went with them tended to attract criticisms even from the contemporaries for being overboard (even though other rulers also made extraordinary claims about their families), including the famous mathematician and astronomer Johannes Stabius. After the origins of the Habsburg had been traced back to Noah, Kunz von der Rosen brought before the emperor a retired soldiers' harlot and a beggar, who petitioned him to support them because they were all descendants of Adam. The emperor laughed. Later, Charles V personally tried to eliminate Theodoric from his grandfather's tomb (which was in some respects also a genealogical work) but failed, while Ferdinand I successfully eliminated Caesar and Ottokar.

For portraits, he preferred woodcuts as it was the cheapest medium. The iconic oil painting Portrait of Emperor Maximilian I by Albrecht Dürer was a rare case another medium was used instead.

=== Architecture ===
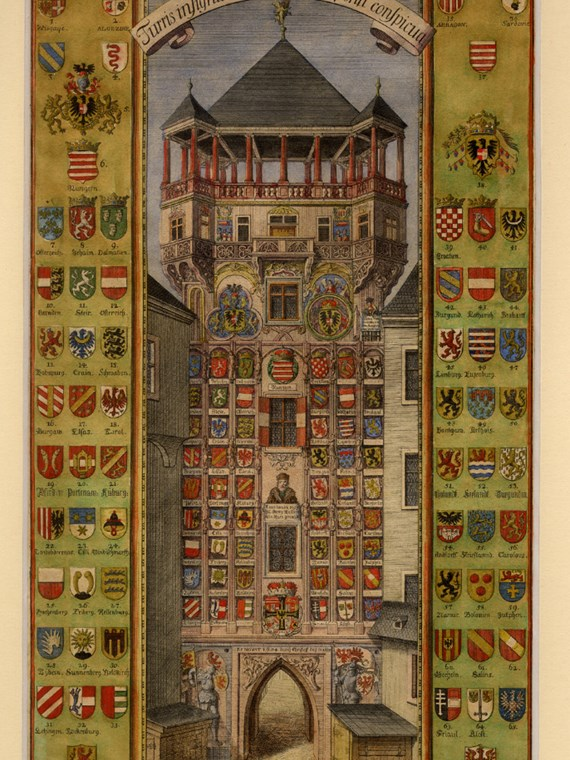
Wappenturm in Innsbruck

- The Wappenturm, or Heraldry Tower (now destroyed) in Innsbruck, was built in 1496 following the design of Jörg Kölderer and the Türing workshop that produced the Goldenes Dachl that stands next to it. It was built near the part of the palace in which arms and armour were stored. The tower serves as a billboard for dynastic propaganda, displaying the coats of arm of the territories (54 in total) Maximilian claimed. The standard bearers here had a more noble look in comparison with those on the Goldenes Dachl. The top showed the bust portraits of Maximilian and his two wives, as if on a royal balcony. Later, another royal couple was added, presumably Ferdinand I and Anna of Hungary and Bohemia.
- A remarkable monument, that was never completed (as work ceased after Maximilian's death), is the Speyer monument to German emperors and empresses (the characters selected are Maximilian's ancestors, together with emperors from the Hohenstaufen and the Salic lines, who were buried at the Speyer Cathedral). The structure was intended to comprise a round temple on twelve octagonal pillars with the whole surmounted by a giant crown. Maximilian seemed to intend to create a bronze effigy of himself as the focal point of the structure. The surviving crown is 6 m in diameter, with a fragment in the shape of a palm leaf being 1.55 m high, and one of the eight surviving sculptures of emperors being 1.78 m high. Like other Maximilianic monuments, the design is more Gothic than Renaissance.

Another plan that was never carried out, partly for financial reason, was a memorial chapel for himself in Falkenstein (Falconstone) near St. Wolfgang. He was going to have himself buried in this area, until the archbishop of Salzburg, Leonhard von Keutschach, persuaded him choose St. George's Cathedral, Wiener Neustadt, probably with considerable financial help.

- Certain previously built structures were utilized and modified to befit Maximilian's propagandistic purposes. An extant example is the towers (Oberer Stadtturm and Unterer Stadtturm, also called Kaiser Maximilians Wappentürme or Maximilian's heraldry towers) in Vöcklabruck, which Maximilian realized to be easy to identify from distance. The facades were altered with frescoes that displayed coats of arms of the territories he ruled and those he aspired to rule as well, as well as an image of himself. During Napoleon's invasion, the frescoes were removed. After 150 years, during renovation, they were discovered and restored.
- The Cour de Bailles was a square (now lost) in front of the Palace of the Dukes of Brabant that Maximilian and Margaret began to build in 1509. The angles were cut off with an open-worked stone balustrade, interrupted by pedestals (that carried the figures of birds and quadrupeds) and octagonal columns on each of which stood a duke of Brabant. The figures were designed by Jan van Roome, alias des Bruxelles, and the sculptor was Jan Borman, who executed them in wood, which would be cast in bronze by Renier van Thienen, who only completed the statues of Godfrey II, Godfrey the Bearded, Maximilian and Charles V. The construction would be completed in 1521 though.
- In 1513, he finished the imposing and very costly tomb of Frederick III in St. Stephen's Cathedral, Vienna (the original design was from the Netherlander Nikolaus Gerhaert of Leiden; Maximilian and his circle played the decisive role in the appointment of the tomb and the décor). This is among "the fourteen burial sites of late-mediaeval kings and emperors of the Holy Roman Empire was never looted, disturbed or altered". There were rumours that the tomb was empty, so a very small opening was created in 1969 for the purpose of observation and recording, but only in 2013, it became possible to take photographs. There are gilt metal plates with inscribed texts that celebrate Frederick's and Maximilian's achievements.

=== Astrology ===
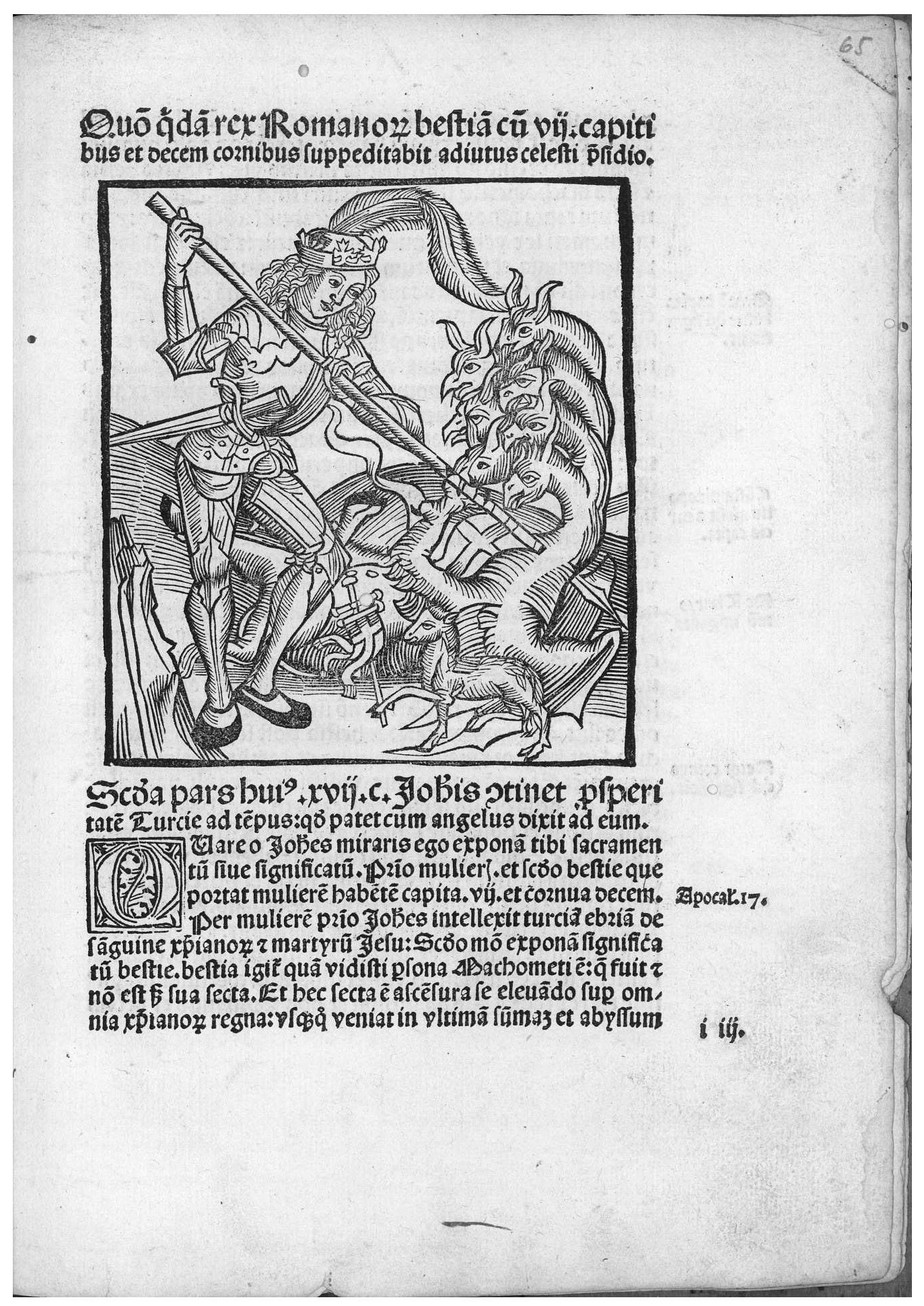
Illustration from the astrological text Tractatus super Methodium (1500 edition). Emperor Maximilian I is shown fighting a seven-headed dragon. The heads represent Mohammed and his sects. This allegory also corresponds to the image of Saint George and the Dragon.

Inheriting an interest in astrology from his father, Maximilian extensively utilized astrological works for propaganda in general and for self-presenting in particular, although Darin Hayton notes that, propaganda here should not be understood as an attempt to deceive the public, as propaganda is sometimes described in the modern sense. Rather, Maximilian and his circles were sincere in their belief of a relationship between politics and science, and in their efforts to promote an enhanced role for scientific knowledge in politics.

- In Johannes Lichtenberger's popular 1488 Pronosticatio, the main fight happens between a pair of eagles (Frederick III and Maximilian, by then King of the Romans) with a wolf (symbol of France; their kings are coded as lilies). The Bavarian Wittelbachs, also antagonistic, are coded as lions. As the author tries to collect as many prophesies as possible, the French are at times presented positive. Even a French version of the emperor-prophecy (Kaiserprophetie) with anti-Habsburg tone is mentioned, that a new "Karl" of French ancestry will rule Germany and reform the Church and his name begins with "P". The author also predicts a conflict between the Eagle and the Pope, as well as the conquest of Rome.
- The Tractatus super Methodium, written by the Augsburg lawyer and cleric Wolfgang Aytinger, edited by Sebastian Brant and printed in 1498 by Michael Furter in Basel, also proved a best-seller, although less well-researched than Lichtenberger's work. Maximilian is shown fighting the Turks, now the main enemy, although it is concluded that the fight will ultimately be won by a king whose name begins with "P" (Philip the Handsome, whose mother comes from Francia)

=== Plays ===
Dramatic works by Maximilian's court scholars and Poet Laureates as well as others who supported him tended to double as encomium for imperial politics and commentary on contemporary events.

- Jakob Locher's Tragedia de Turcis et Suldano and Historia de rege Frantie supported Maximilian's anti-Ottoman and anti-French agenda. The works predicted the defeat of the French and the Ottoman (even though the fighting had not started yet). Historia de rege Frantie is the first German Neo-Latin tragedy, also the first German Humanist tragedy.
- Konrad Celtis wrote for Maximilian Ludus Dianae and Rhapsodia de laudibus et victoria Maximiliani de Boemannis. The Ludus Dianae displays the symbiotic relationship between ruler and humanist, who are both portrayed as Apollonian or Phoebeian. Maximilian was the most important of Celtis's earthly Apollos, while Celtis, as one of the most important advisors of Maximilian, played an essential role in shaping the image of Maximilian.

The other humanists support this image as well – the idea behind was that an ideal ruler outshone everything. The function of the emperor as the promoter of arts and learning (Musagetes or Musarum pater) was important but the political mission was highlighted as well (as shown by Willibald Pirckheimer's text that accompanied the Great Triumphal Carriage, mentioned above.) Apollo was also the symbol of the Renaissance that Celtis and the humanists wanted to bring to Germany.

=== Poems ===
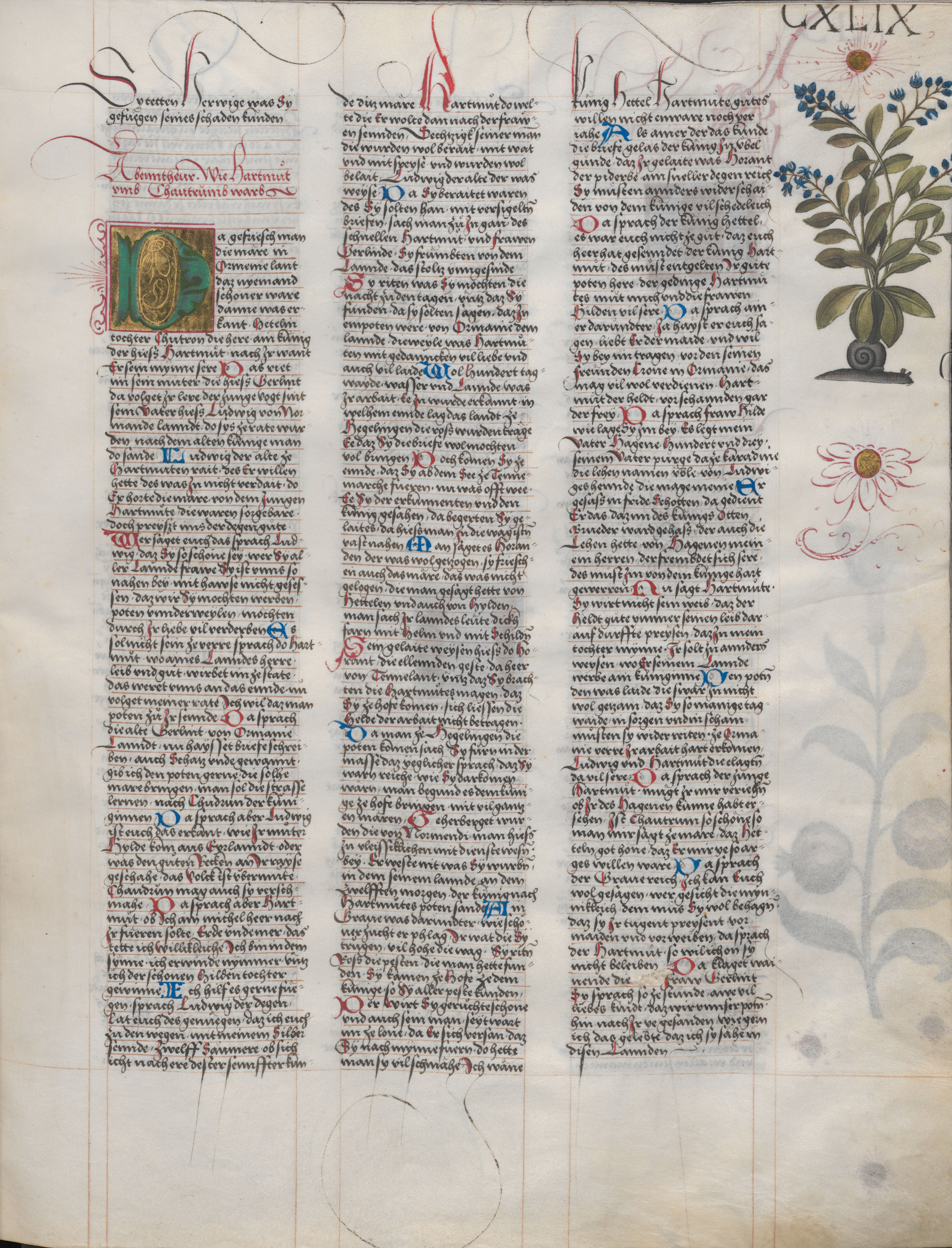
Ambraser Heldenbuch, Fol. 149. Kudrun

- The character of Priest King Johannes or John as recorded in the Ambraser Heldenbuch (a compendium of medieval epic, partly inspired by the frescoes depicting ancient heroes Maximilian saw in the Runkelstein Castle) commissioned by Maximilian and written by Hans Ried, according to Klaus Amann is an alter ego of Maximilian, who considered himself as a descendant of the race of Holy Grail (Gralsgeschlecht). The story of Loherangrin, son of Parzival and cousin of John, as recorded by Wolfram von Eschenbach's work, is also connected to Maximilian's life story, as Loherangrin was taken by a swan to Antwerp, where he married the Princess of Brabant. When asked by his wife where he had come from (something he had forbidden her to do), Loherangrin left, but their descendants remained. Many generations later, Maximilian married the Princess of Burgundy (Mary of Burgundy, who was also Duchess of Brabant).

Rainer Schöffl connects the story of Kriemhild and Siegfried in the Nibelungenlied (also part of the Ambraser Heldenbuch) to Mary of Burgundy and Maximilian. Kriemhild, also a Burgundian princess, is often shown with a falcon. The "falcon dream" (Falkentraum) is a favourite motif the Nibelungenlied. In the first adventure, she dreamed of a tame falcon who was killed by two eagles. In the story, Siegfried set out for Worms (capital of the Kingdom of Burgundy according to the Nibelungenlied) because he heard of Kriemhild's beauty. Siegfried is depicted as a passionate hunter, too, with equipments similar to those used by Maximilian, as shown by his Geheimen Jagdbuch (Hunting Book). He is also a dragon slayer like Maximilian's favorite saint, Saint George. Schöffl notes, though, that the emperor must have realized that some of Siegfried's actions (like cheating Brunhild with a magical cloak to gain Kriemhild as a "bought bride") did not fit into his chivalrous concepts, and that was why he did not claim Siegfried as one of his ancestors. Like Maximilian and Mary's marriage, Siegfried and Kriemhild's marriage also became a love marriage, but ended too soon and suddenly, in a violent manner. Gunda Lange writes that the Nibelungenlied and the Kudrun (both take the woman as the central character and are put next to each other in the Ambraser Heldenbuch) are connected by the overuse of the dangerous courtship motif, which seems to reflect Maximilian's literary preferences, as this is the way his courtship of Mary of Burgundy is stylized in his works. Christopher Wood links the Ambraser Heldenbuch to extensive archaeological activities by Maximilian (already started by his father Frederick III around the city of Worms). The work seemed to be intended to double as materials for his genealogical projects.

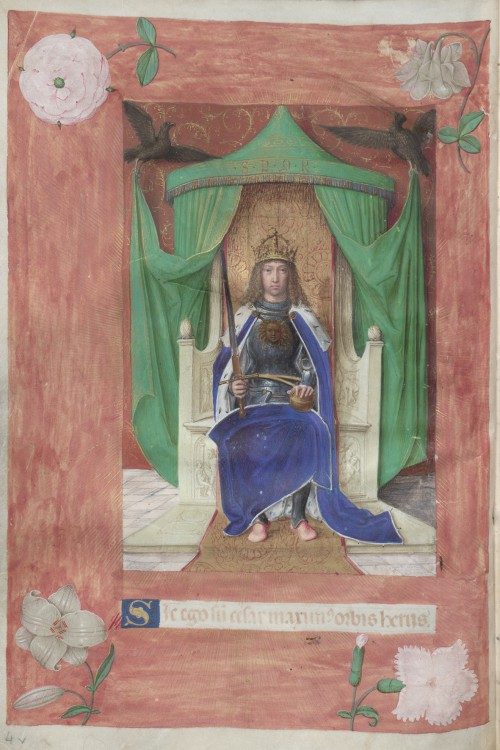
Miniature depicting a youthful, idealized Maximilian by Gerard David, from the illustrated manuscript Encomia, consisting of three books of panegyric poems, written by Johannes Michael Nagonius for the emperor. Between 1493 and 1504.

- The epic Austriados (around 1513) glorifies Maximilian's deeds in the War of Bavarian succession. The author was Riccardo Bartolini (born 1470), Maximilian's "most important Neo-Latin panegyrist". This is one of the Latin epics dedicated to the emperor by Italian poets, including Encomiastica (1504) by Giovanni Stefano Emiliano Cimbriaco, Pronostichon de futuro imperio propagando (1493/1494) by Giovanni Michele Nagonio, Magnanimus (ca. 1517–1519) by Riccardo Sbruglio. Pulina notes that the epics aspire to connect to traditional ideals and models of heroization, but also adapt to the person of Maximilian and contemporary developments.
- Sebastian Brandt was a lifelong admirer of the emperor and dedicated various panegyrical works to him, although he criticized Maximilian on some aspects.

For example, he criticized the court historians who fawned over their prince in his The ship of fools:

I wish I had a covered ship
Wherein all courtiers I would slip
And those who eat at nobles' board
And hobnob with a mighty lord
So that they may be undisturbed
And by the rabble never curbed.

- Helius Eobanus Hessus, widely reputed to be Germany's finest Latin poet and never crowned Poet Laureate, rebuked the emperor for rewarding undeserved poets, and expressed his pride that it was the Muse who gave him the laurel:

Nubila scandentem lauri de stipite cygnum
Hesso stemma suum Iibera Musa dedit.

The generous Muse gave Hessus for his device the swan
rising from the laurel branch to the clouds.

- Ulrich von Hutten was in the service of the emperor for some time, and wrote poems dedicated to Maximilian. One of this was Italia to Maximilian, to which Eobanus Hessus replied with Maximilian to Italia, using the emperor's name.
- Jean Molinet's chef d'oevre "Ressource du petit peuple" (a work about the fates of "small people" in wars), described either as poem or rhythming prose, addressed Maximilian, whose character he praised but whose politics he reproached. Before Maximilian came to Burgundian lands, Molinet wrote Le naufrage de la Pucelle (1477), a work that mixed prose and poetry that advised Mary of Burgundy (presented in the work as the Pucelle) on how to deal with the death of her father and the threat from France (presented as whales and sea monsters). Maximilian was alluded to as an eagle that would save the ship. When Molinet depicted them as pagan deities, like in Bergier sans Soulas (1485), Mary was portrayed as Lune (Moon, Diana) while Maximilian was Apollon, Phoebus, Titan or King of Ilion, Philip was Jupiter, Margaret of Austria was Venus, while the King of France was Pan and the King of England was Neptune. In an updated version of his Complainte (the original was written in 1464), Maximilian was a lion and Mars.
- In their 1507 Cosmographiae Introductio (a revolutionary work in cartography, together with the map Universalis Cosmographia that accompanies it), Martin Waldseemüller and Matthias Ringmann wrote in the dedication to Maximilian:

Since thy Majesty is sacred throughout the vast world
Maximilian Caesar, in the furthest lands,
Where Phoebus Apollo raises his golden head from eastern waves
And seeks the straits called by Hercules' name,
Where midday glows under his burning rays,
Where the Great Bear freezes the surface of Ocean ...

The poem is short but often noted for the connection between cosmography and imperial ideology.

=== Drawings, paintings and engravings ===
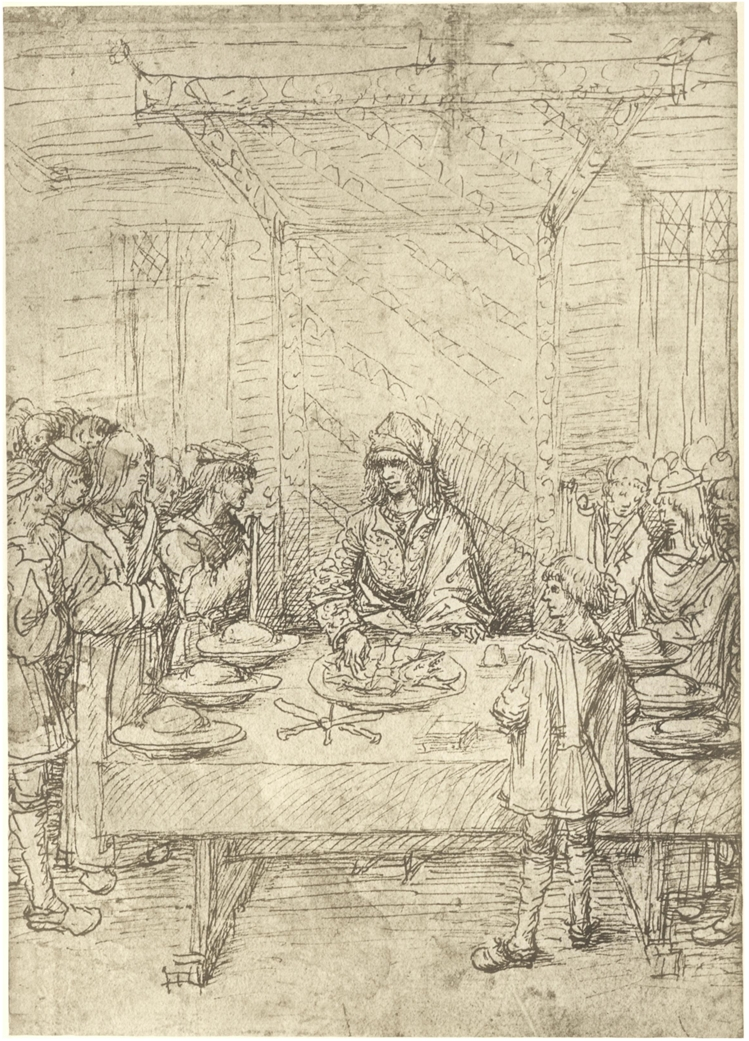
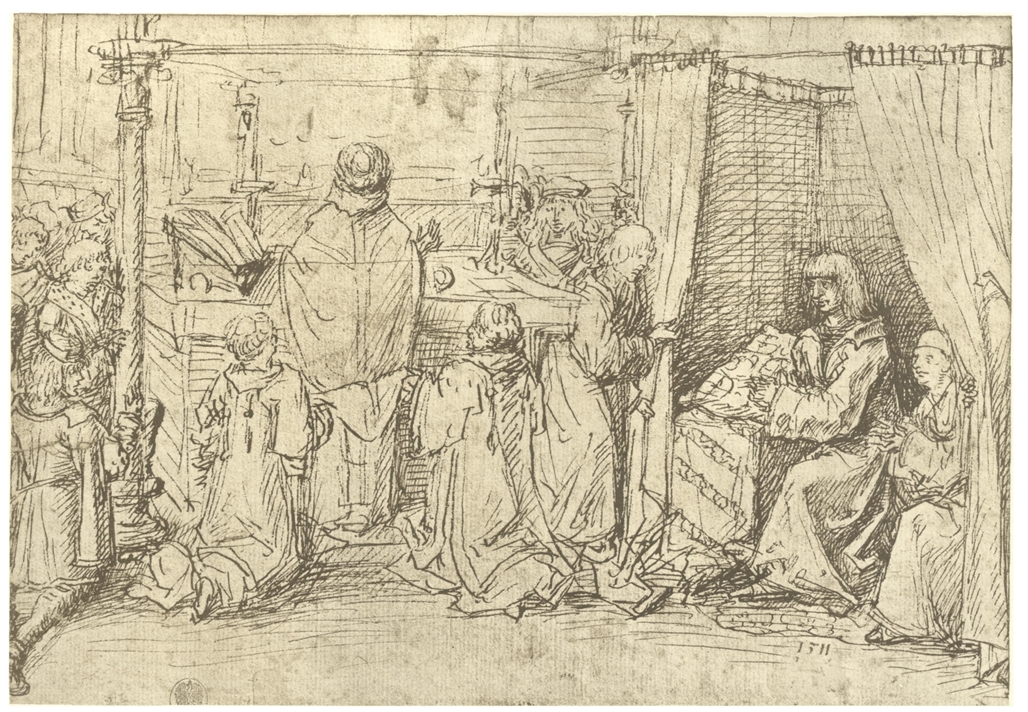
Contemporary sketches portraying Maximilian's last banquet and the Mass of Peace in Bruges, 1488.
- A pair of sketches (late fifteenth century or early sixteenth century at the latest) portray the King of the Romans, pale and emaciated after almost three months of imprisonment (although his captors tried to make his imprisonment pleasant with banquets and luxury), having a banquet and attending the Mass of Peace on his last day in Bruges. Warburg and Friedländer opine that the sketches likely reflect an immediate visual experience, because, among other reasons, from a retrospective point-of-view, an artist would not consider the banquet an important moment and no one would want to be reminded of the oath Maximilian was forced to take and later did not keep.

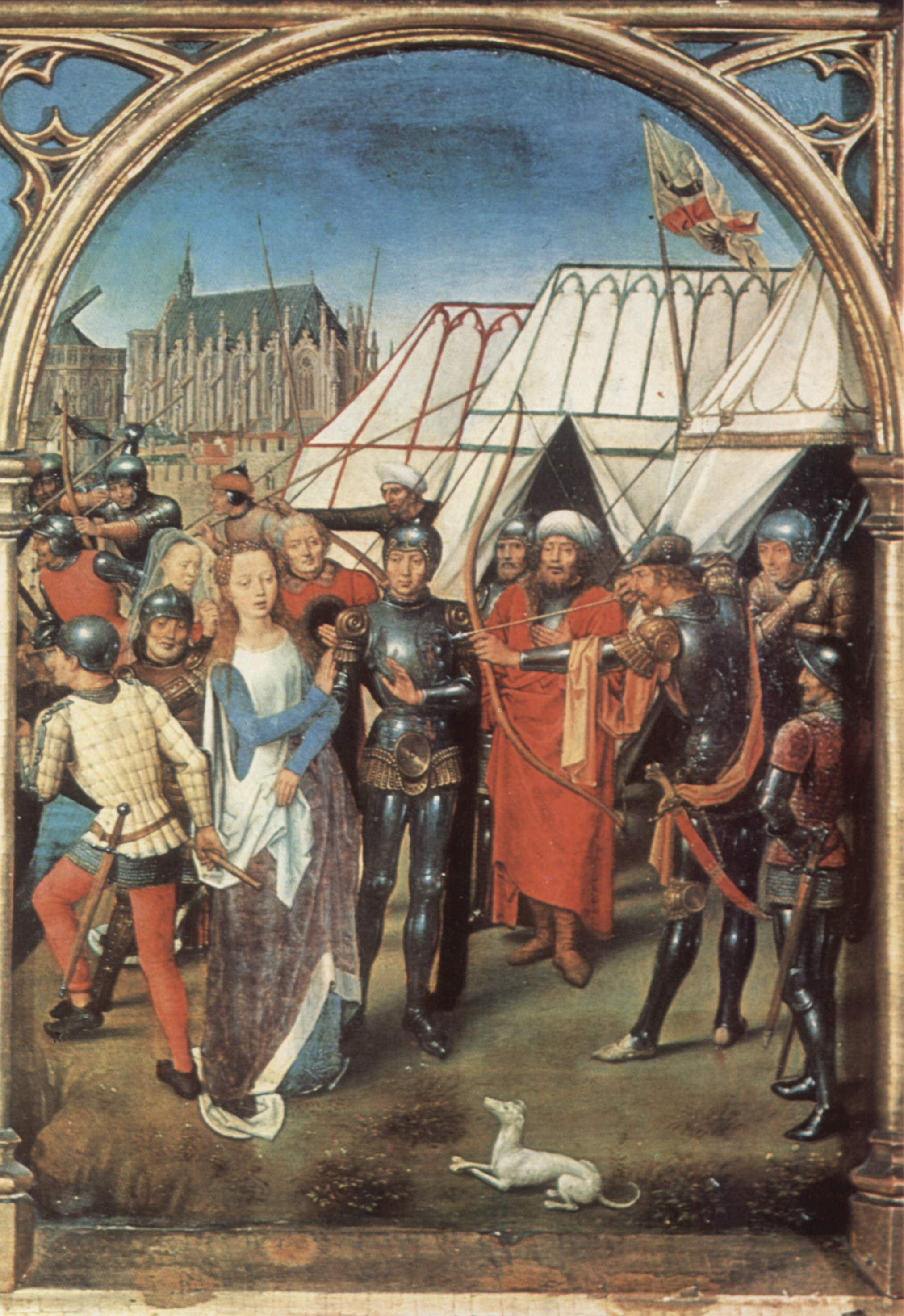
The last panel of St. Ursula Shrine by Hans Memling. Note the eagle on the flag.

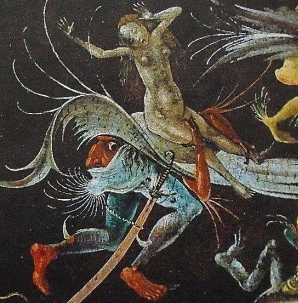
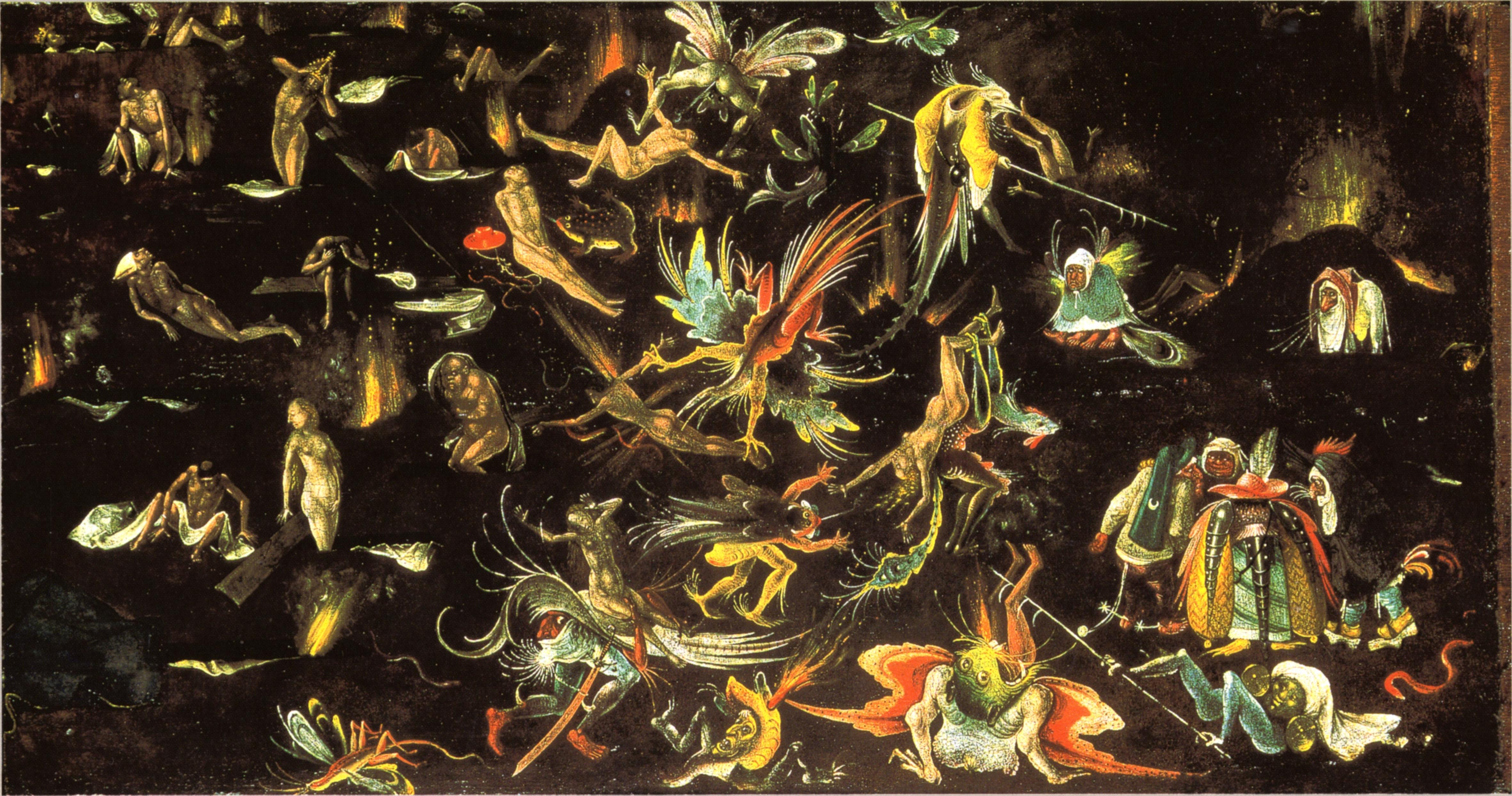
Detail of the Last Judgement (c. 1506-1508) by follower of Hieronymus Bosch: A demon carrying a woman away – an allegory of Maximilian kidnapping Mary of Burgundy.

During the 1482–1492 Flemish revolts against Maximilian as well as the later war against Guelders (which was believed, by many, as a dynastic struggle between the Habsburgs and the King of France, that had nothing to do with the Low Countries), as continual warfare and taxes (levied to support those wars) put pressure on the society – including the middle class that the contemporary renown painter belonged to, many works portraying Maximilian in a satyrical way appeared.

The signs through which one can recognize the allusion to Maximilian and tend to be the features of his face, especially his distinctive nose, and the imperial eagle.

- Hans Memling's St. Ursula Shrine, dated around 1488–89, showed the author as an opponent of Maximilian's politics.

During the 1510s and 1520s, Maximilian's vassals and retainers tended to commission Holy Kinship paintings to praise the Habsburg's marriage politics and also to pray for the prosperity of their own family. Other examples include:

- In 1509, Lucas Cranach the Elder painted the famous Holy Kinship Altarpiece for Frederick and John, the brother Electors of Saxony. In this instance, as the brothers were territorial lords instead of Maximilian's direct vassals, the appearance of the emperor as Cleophas (left) seemed to have another purpose, related to political problems within their territory. Here Maximilian-Cleophas was the husband of Anne and not Mary Cleophas like in the Strigel diptych.
- The famous diptych of Maximilian's extended family (after 1515), painted by Bernhard Strigel, labels Mary of Burgundy as "Mary Cleophas, believed to be sister of the Virgin Mary" while Maximilian was labeled as Cleophas, brother of Joseph. This painting was likely commissioned to commemorate the 1516 double wedding (between House of Habsburg and House of Hungary) and then bequeathed to the scholar Johannes Cuspinian as a sign of imperial favour (it would become part of his family altar and some years later was paired with another Holy Kinship painting that depicted the family of Cuspinian).
- Sebastian Scheel's 1517 altarpiece, in which the emperor also features as Cleophas.
- Jan van Scorel's Holy Kinship Altarpiece, painted in 1520, in which St. Joseph, who wore a hat reminiscent of the style of the Order of the Golden Fleece and had a hawk nose, clearly resembled Maximilian.
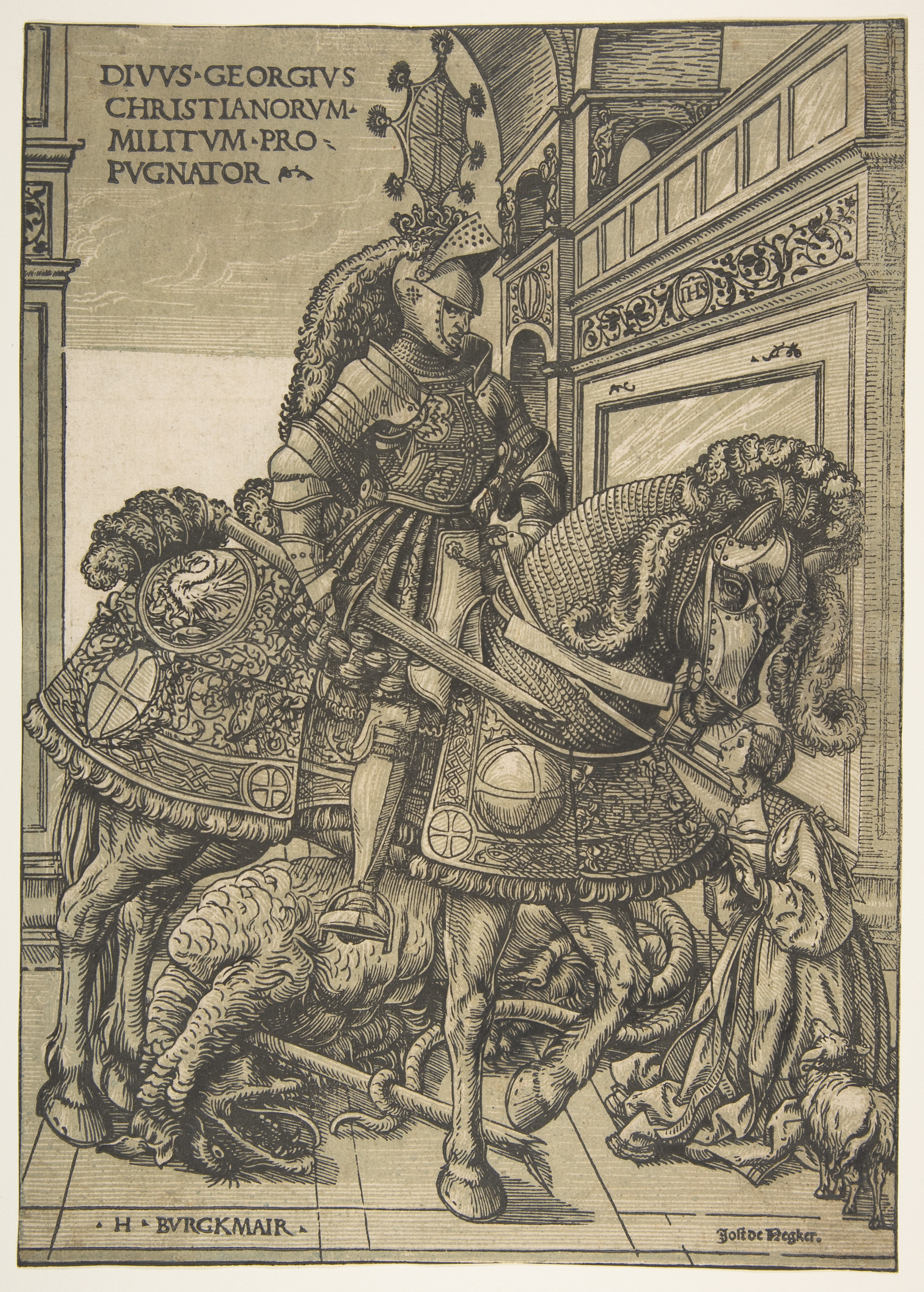
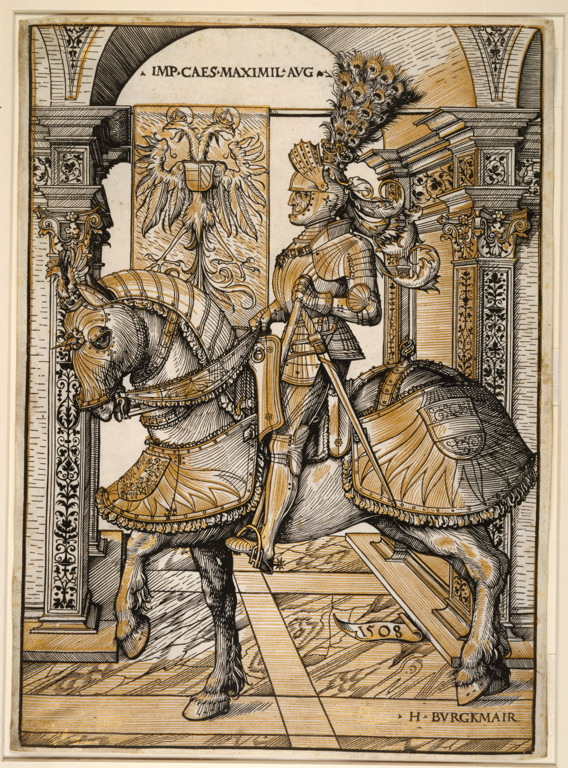
Hans Burgkmair's double chiascuro woodcuts, featuring Saint Georgle and Emperor Maximilian I, 1508.

Saint George was the emperor's favourite saint. Maximilianic iconography tends to fuse the saint and the emperor, as the Defender of Christendom. The cult of Saint George nurtured by Maximilian caused ambitious rivals to emulate to compete with him (for example, Frederick the Wise of Saxony hired Lucas Cranach to make works depicting Saint George for him, that rivalled those made for the emperor).

- In 1508, the year Maximilian became Emperor-elect, Hans Burgkmair executed double chiascuro woodcuts, featuring Saint Georgle and Maximilian, completed with an inscription describing him as "vanguard of the army of Christians".
- Around 1509–1510, Daniel Hopfer created the etching The Emperor Maximilian as Saint George (dated by Madar to 1518/1520 and Silver to 1519).
- Around 1515, Lucas Cranach produced the work Maximilian idealized as Saint George.

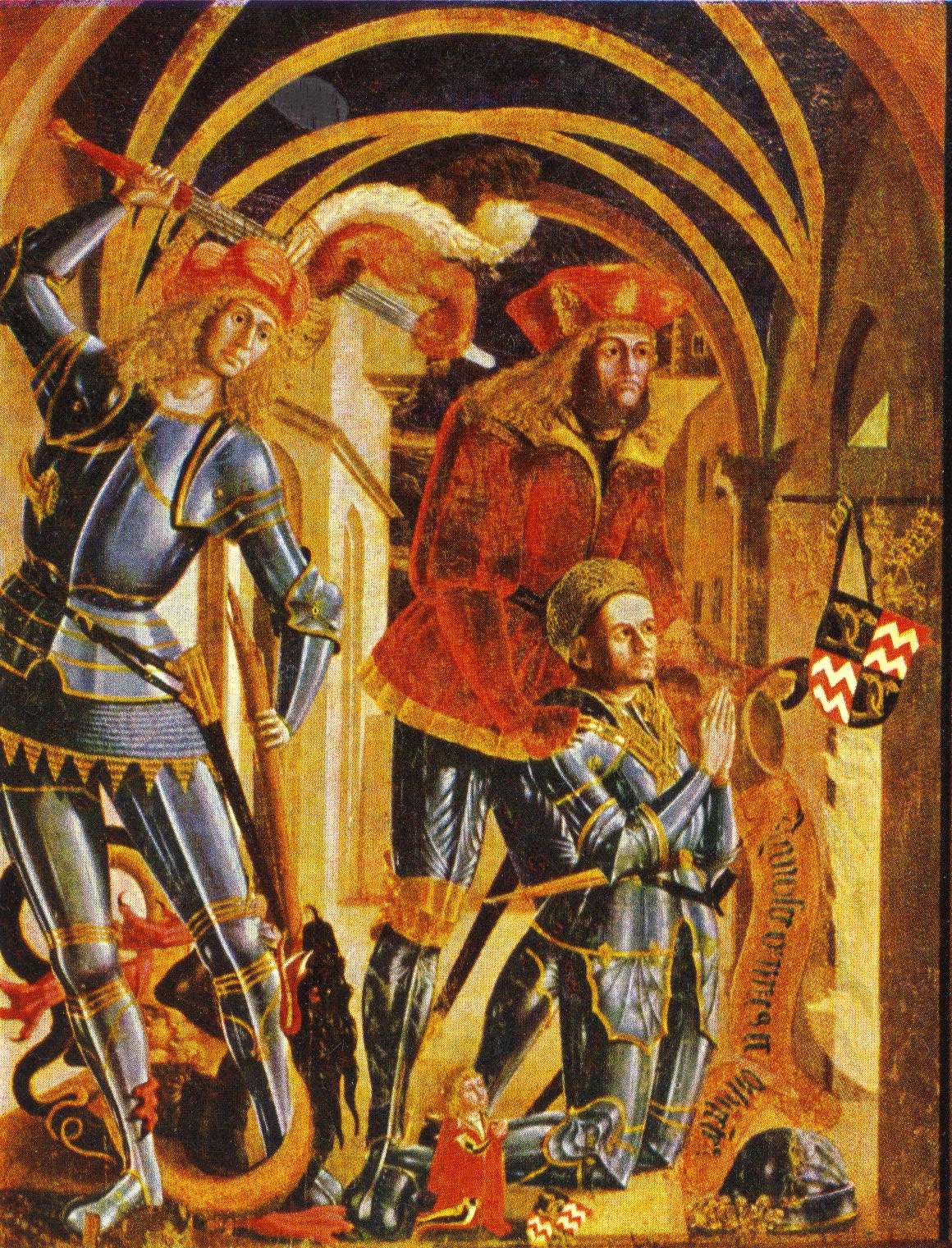
Waldauf's altarpiece by Marx Reichlich

On his deathbed, Maximilian planned a project called Arch of Devotion (Andacht), of which the title page would show "Maximilian, crowned and enthronedin the armor of the Order of St. George, whose shield hangs above him, balanced by the joint arms of Austria and Burgundy, alongside the central imperial arms above the throne". The emperor also ordered that: "Write [of] my Tomb institution and the Order of St. George as well as of my family and ordained descent." The plan was never carried out. Instead, his death was glorified by a woodcut by Hans Springinklee under the order of Johannes Stabius that described a complete different scheme (see below) The idea was laid out in 1512. It is unclear whether this was meant as a counterpart for the Ehrenpforte or a program for the fresco cycle of the planned memorial chapel in Falkenstein. Müller opines that it is possible it was intended to serve both purposes.

Maximilian's veneration of Saint George also influenced the knights of his time, who shared his ideals of chivalry.

- Hans von Hungerstein (1460–1503) commissioned the Master of the Strasbourg Chronicle to illustrate his personal edition with a depiction of Maximilian as an ideal knight, with features of Saint George. The depiction also shows how von Hungerstein, as a knight himself, wanted to be remembered.
- The knight Florian Waldauf, Maximilian's trusted companion who rose from a low status and was a significant patron and collector of artworks himself (several artworks commissioned by Waldauf depict Maximilian), modelled himself after the emperor in veneration of the saint. The portrait of Waldauf by Marx Reichlich (1500–1505) In the altarpiece he commissioned from Marx Reichlich, Saint George and Saint Florian appeared behind a kneeling Waldauf. Art historians usually note that the one who is depicted in the form of Maximilian is Saint Florian, Waldauf's name saint though.

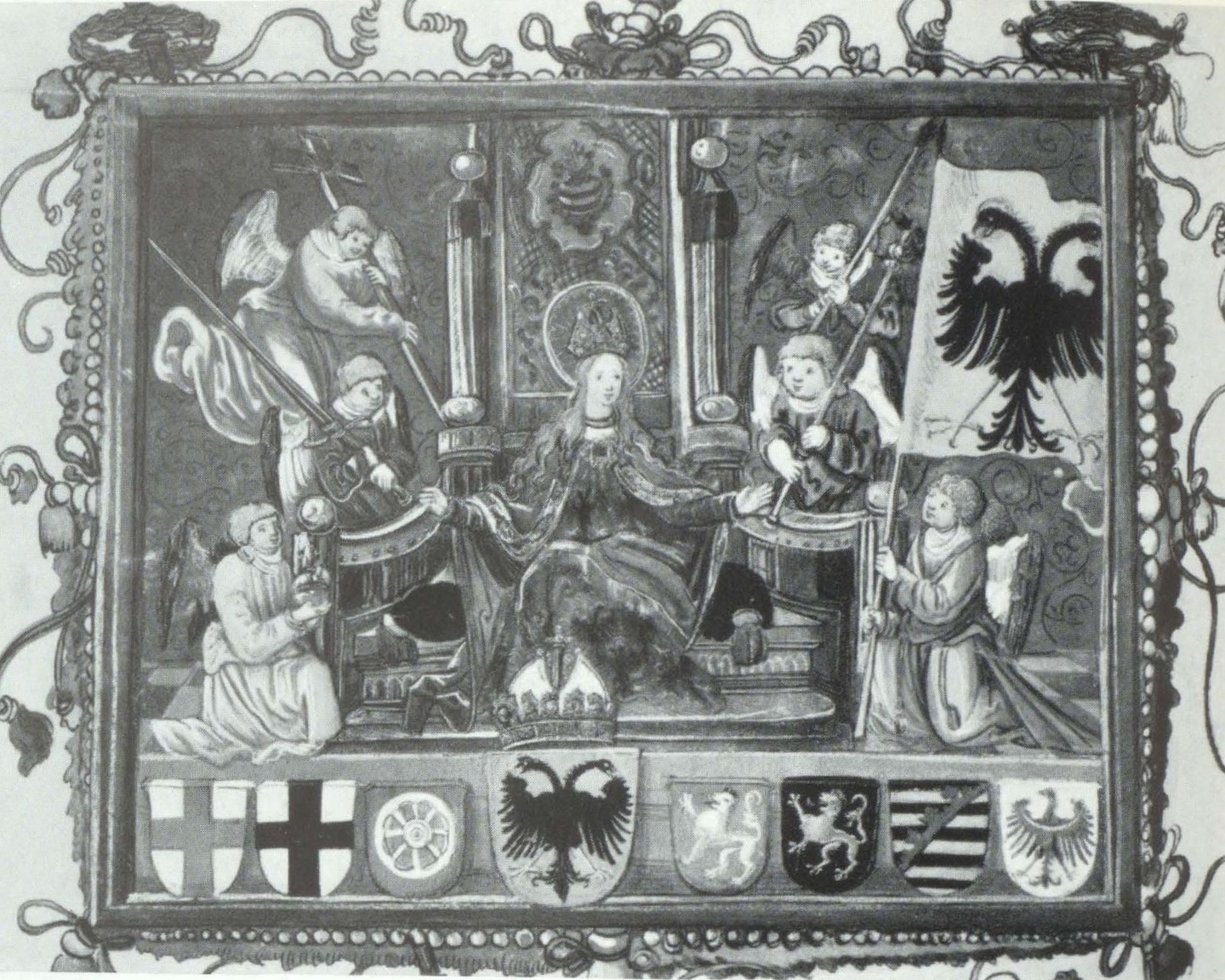
Personification of the Reich as Germania by Jörg Kölderer, 1512. The "German woman", as Maximilian personally dictated, wears her hair loose and a crown, sitting on the Imperial throne, corresponds both to the self-image of Maximilian I as King of Germany and the formula Holy Roman Empire of the German Nation (omitting other nations). She now takes central stage in Maximilian's Triumphal Procession, being carried in front of Roma.

During his reign, Maximilian and his humanists reinvented Germania as the mother of the Holy Roman Empire of the German Nation. In the previous eras, she was presented as one of the lands conquered or ruled by the Roman emperors, and then by the Holy Roman Emperors (see also: History of the personified Germania), often in subordination to both imperial power and Italia (or Roma) and Gallia. In Maximilian's imagination, she reflected the self-image of emperor and took a central role in his Triumphal Procession (Maximilian died before this project was completed though. When it was first printed in 1526 by Archduke Ferdinand, the future emperor, she disappeared.) She was pacific, yet virile, and as the emperor personally dictated, with her hair loose and wearing a crown. She was presented as Mother, Sovereign Lady (Herrscherin), the Empire and the Birthland, as well as embodiment of Imperial rulership. The humanist Heinrich Bebel also spread a story about his dream, in which Germania told him to talk to her son (Maximilian).

His first wife, Mary of Burgundy, played an important role in Maximilianic iconography, as display of personal attachment or representation of the fusion of the Houses of Burgundy and Austria or both. In many cases, her iconography is blended with that of the Virgin Mary, who was her patron, and also especially revered by the emperor (his other favourite saints tended to be military saints).

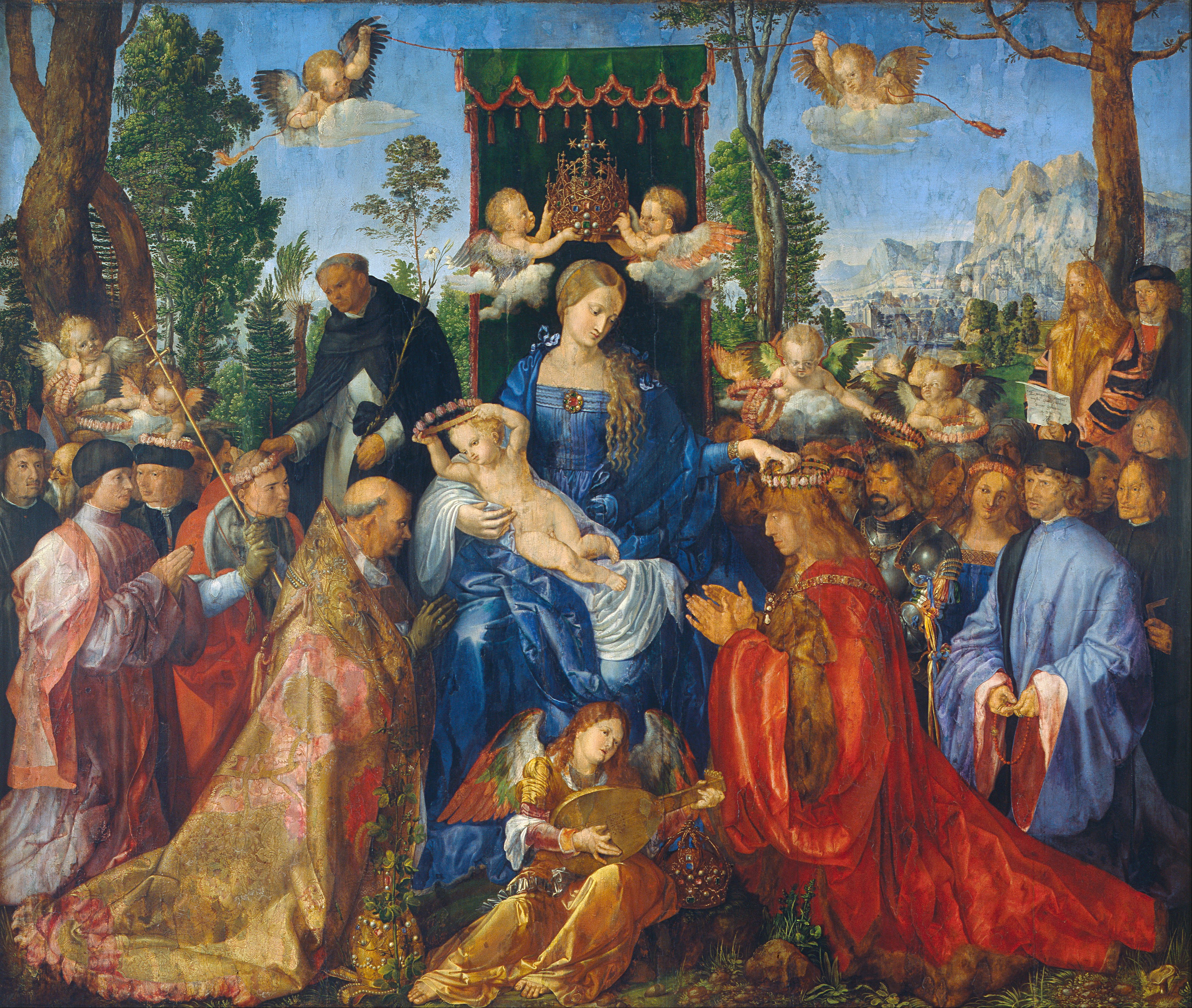
Albrecht Dürer – Feast of the Rosary, 1506

Maximilian kept certain themes consistent in representations of the two Marys and his association with them for decades. According to Silver, when he supervised Mary of Burgundy's tomb in the Church of Our Lady in Bruges, Maximilian had already anticipated some later elements for his own burial. Their tombs were both made in bronze, and both of them were buried beneath the altar. Both tombs show attention to the assertive rather than the mournful side of family ancestry and possessions.

- In the Hours of Mary of Burgundy (according to Anna Eörsi, Maximilian was the last commissioner of this book, likely from the time he became Mary's husband or a new father. Images were also added after Mary's death. Hugo van der Goes was likely the illustrator), (folio 14v), Maximilian appears as a deacon waving the censer and bowing down before the Virgin (image of Mary of Burgundy) and the Child (image of Philip the Fair), the new ruler of the world. The image is likely inspired by the legend of Augustus paying homage to the infant Jesus.

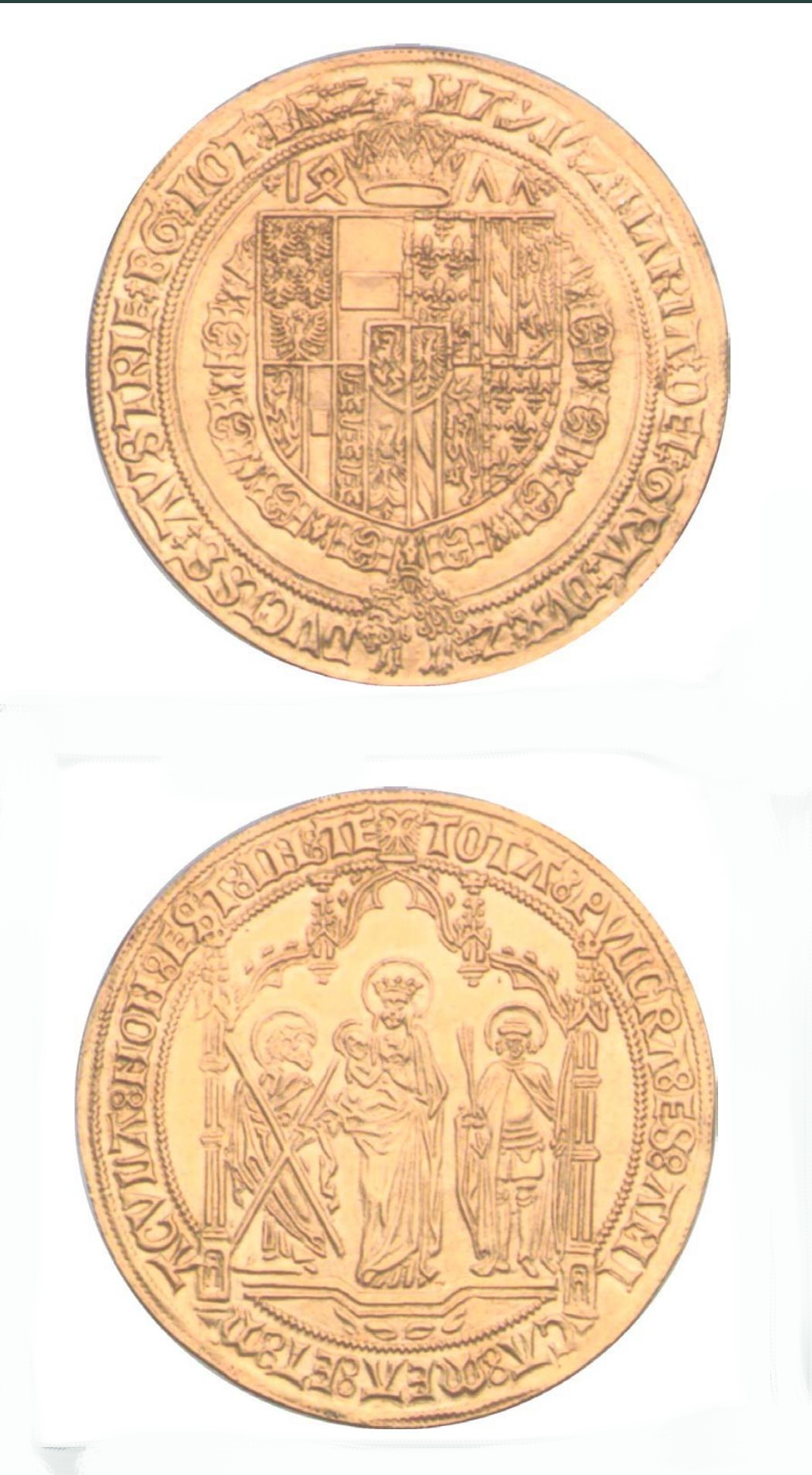
Medal usually thought to have been struck to commemorate the marriage between Mary of Burgundy and Maximilian of Austria..

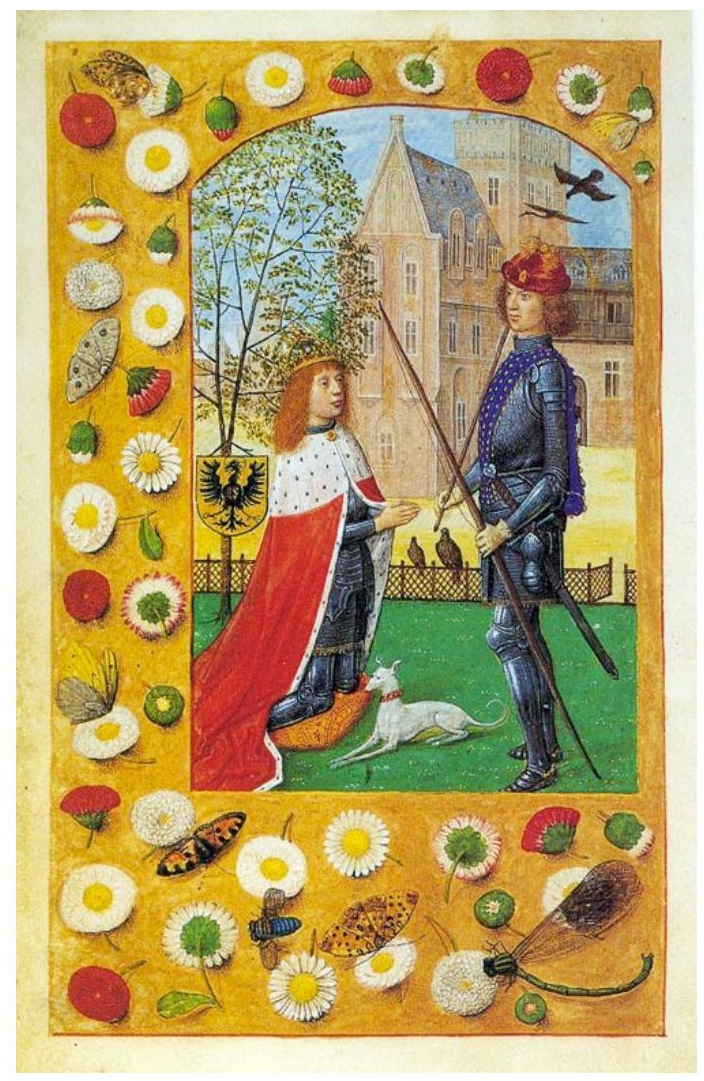
Maximilian praying to Saint Sebastian with three falcons in the background, Maximilian's Old Prayers Book, 1486

- Eörsi notes that in 1477, a medal celebrating Mary and Maximilian's wedding (likely commissioned by Maximilian himself), displays the motif of the Virgin with Child as well, with an inscription using content from the Song of Songs ("tota pvlcra es amica mea et macvla non est in te": "you are wholly fair and there is no blemish in you") – the obverse shows names and coats-of-arms of the couple while the reverse show the Virgin between two saints. Karaskova agrees that the one who commissioned this medal should be Maximilian but the date must have been much later (a sign is the symbol of the Order of the Golden Fleece, which he did not become a member – and its sovereign – until 1478).

The appearance on the medal of Saint Sebastian, a saint to whom Maximilian especially devoted, seems to suggest the connection to his status as King of the Romans (he was elected in 1486). Also in this year, an image produced for the book usually called Maximilian's Old Prayers Book was created, showing Maximilian praying to Saint Sebastian. There are three falcons in the picture: the one chasing another bird seems to be an allegory for Maximilian himself, protecting mother and child (Mary and Philip).

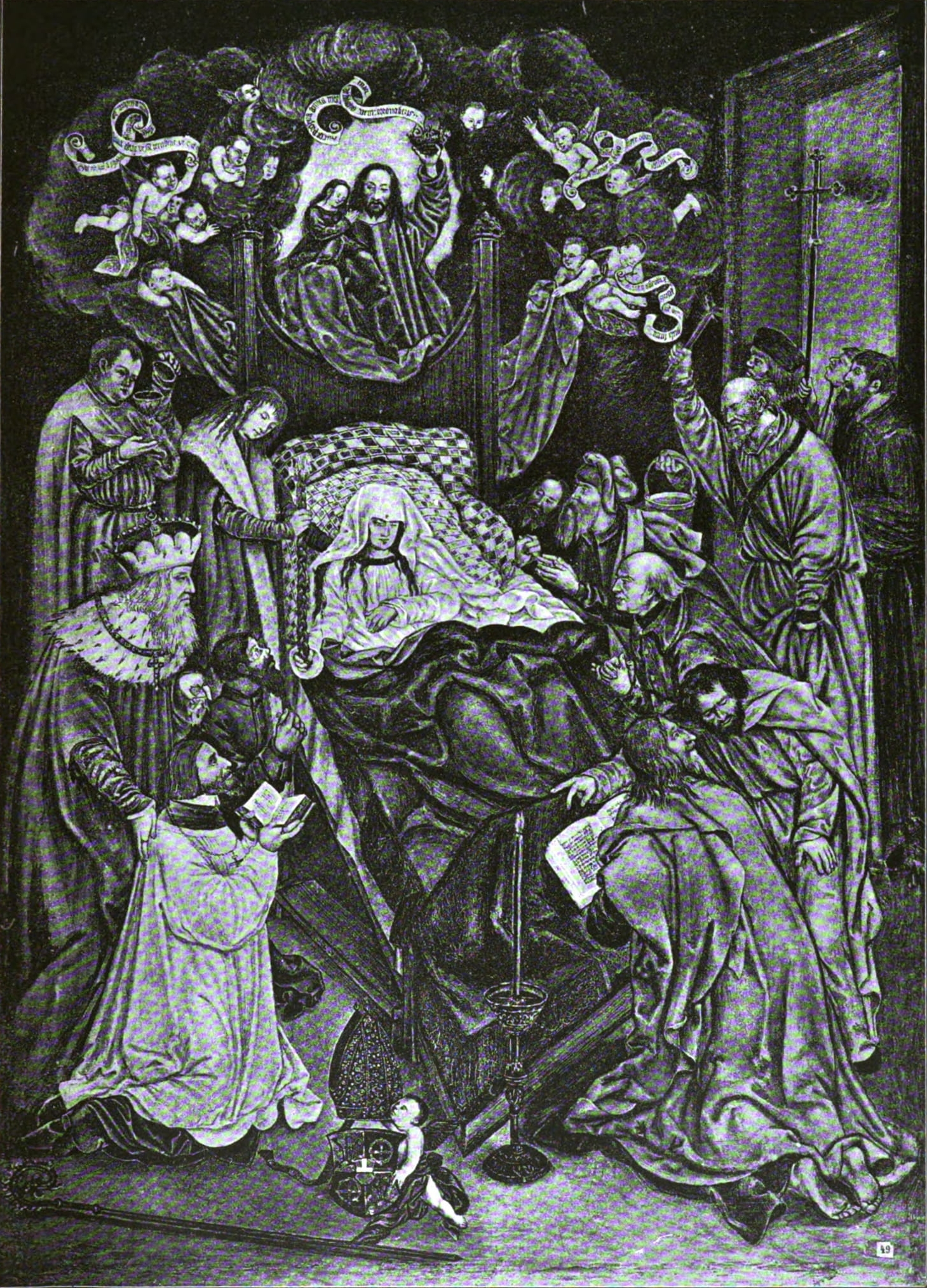
Death of the Virgin, or the Dying Mary of Burgundy, Albrecht Dürer, 1518. The whereabouts of the original painting is now unknown.

- In one of Albrecht Dürer's most famous works, the Feast of the Rosary, the Virgin Mary (representation of Mary of Burgundy, according to Klaas van der Heide) was depicted holding the infant Jesus (representation of Philip the Fair) while placing a rosary on the head of a kneeling Maximilian.

Rothenberg notes that, in the painting (considered by him to be a "direct visual counterpart" to the motet Virgo prudentissima, mentioned below), "The most prudent Virgin thus crowns the Wise King with a rose garland at the very moment when she herself is about to be crowned Queen of Heaven."

- In Dürer's 1518 Death of the Virgin, or the Dying Mary of Burgundy, which anticipated the emperor's death in 1519, Maximilian is shown as an apostle bowing down in distress (next to Zlatkonia, the commissioner of the painting, who is shown as reading an open book in the middle of the room; Philip the Fair is depicted as a young Saint John standing next to Mary) in front of the dying Virgin (or Mary of Burgundy). Her soul, depicted as an infant, is about to get crowned by Christ in Heaven. Anna Jameson remarks that, the painting "all the legendary and supernatural incidents with the most intense and homely reality". The Latin inscriptions are passages taken from the Canticles, or Song of Songs, about Mary, coming from the Desert, beautiful as the moon and excellent as the sun, terrible as an army, rising to be reunited with her beloved and crowned in Heaven. (Note: "'Surge, propera, amicamca; reni de Libano, veni coronaberis' (Canticles. iv. 8.); 'Quœ est ista quœ: progreditur quasi aurora consurgens, pulchra, ut luna, electa ut sol, terribilis ut castrorum (wies ordinata?)' (Cant. vi. 10); on another, 'Quœ est ista quoe ascendit de deserto deliciis affluens super dilectum suum?' (Cant. viii. 5); 'Quœ. est ista quæ ascendit super dilectum suum ut virgula fumi?' ( Cant. iii. 6.)")
- The motif of the Virgin and the Eagle, as the shared iconography of Mary of Burgundy and Maximilian, was also seen during Maximilian's "joyous entry" into Antwerp (1478), on one of the tableaux presented to him by the city. An eagle (also alluded to as the presence of the Holy Spirit) was shown offering his own blood to the maiden. The symbol for both Antwerp and Burgundy was also a virgin, while the eagle was the symbol of the House of Habsburg. The Antwerp (later, his loyal ally in his later turbulent regency) community seemed to welcome Maximilian as their saviour, but also wanted to subtly remind him of limits to his powers and his responsibilities as ruler together with Mary.

=== Music ===
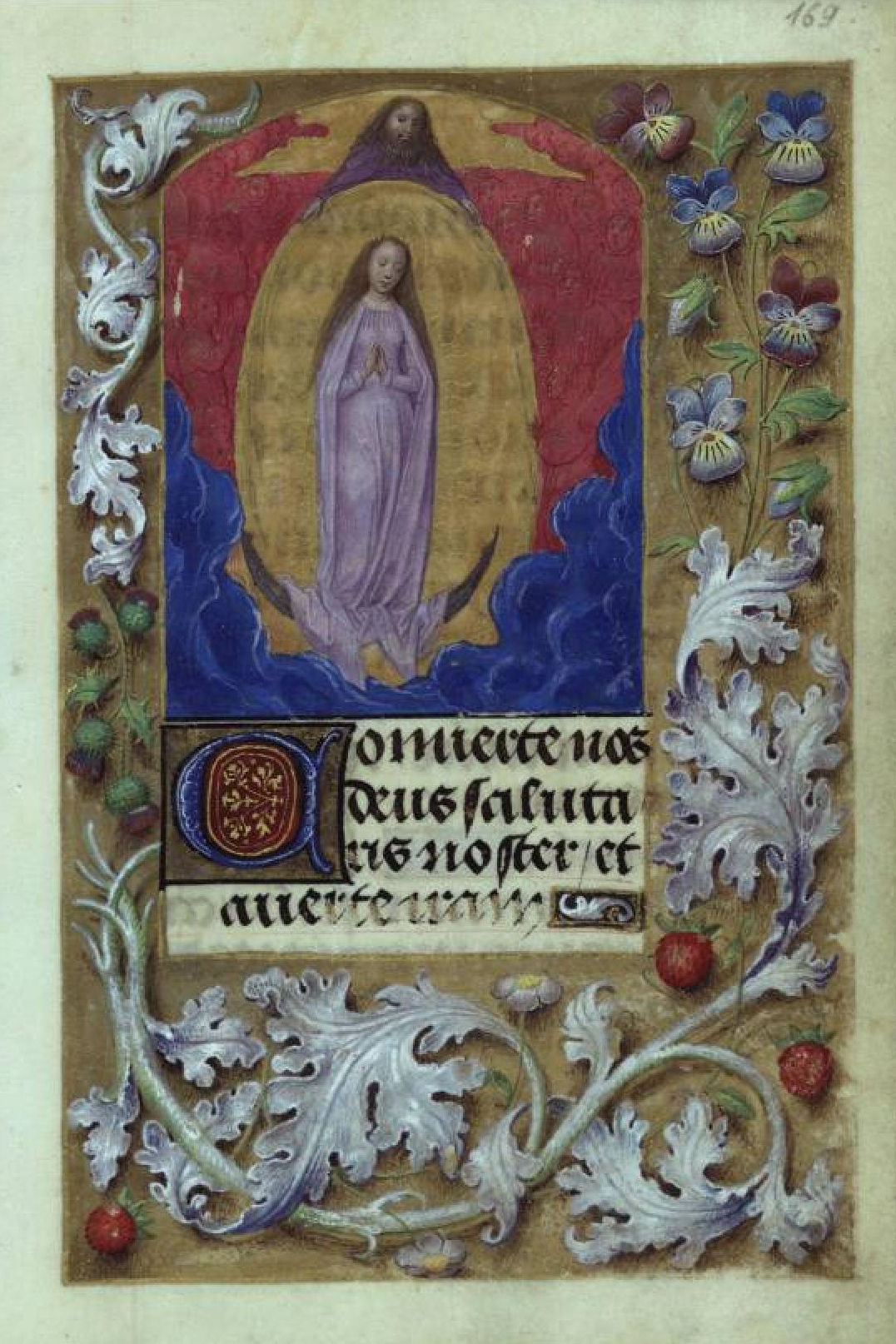
Assumption of the Virgin from the Berlin Book of hours of Mary of Burgundy and Maximilian, dated around 1482, Staatliche Museen zu Berlin, Kupferstichkabinett Handschrift 78 B 12. "And a great sign appeared in heaven: A woman clothed with the sun, and the moon under her feet, and on her head a crown of twelve stars."

- The monumental motet Virgo Prudentissima, that describes the Assumption of the Virgin Mary, was commissioned by Maximilian and written by Heinrich Isaac in preparation of the 1508 coronation of the emperor and played a very important role in Maximilianic iconography. It affiliates the reigns of two sovereign monarches – the Virgin Mary of Heaven and Maximilian of the Holy Roman Empire. The motet describes the Assumption of the Virgin, in which Mary, described as the most prudent Virgin (allusion to Parable of the Ten Virgins), "beautiful as the moon", "excellent as the sun" and "glowing brightly as the dawn", was crowned as Queen of Heaven and united with Christ, her bridegroom and son, at the highest place in Heaven. Rothenberg notes that, "In Isaac's compositions Mary becomes the figurative mother who crowns Maximilian, just as King Solomon's mother had crowned him." Other than Dürer's Feast of the Rosary, Rothenberg opines that the idea of the motet is also reflected in the scene of the Assumption seen in the Berlin Book of hours of Mary of Burgundy and Maximilian. The antiphon of the motet reads:

Virgo prudentissima, quo
progrederis quasi aurora valde
rutilans? Filia Syon tota formosa
et suavis es, pulchra ut luna
electa ut sol.

Most prudent Virgin, where are you
going glowing brightly as the dawn?
Daughter of Zion, you are wholly fair
and sweet, beautiful as the moon,
excellent as the sun.

The motet's text by George Slatkonia, expanding on the antiphon, reads: "The most prudent Virgin, who brought holy joys to the world, and transcended all spheres, and melted the stars beneath her feet with brilliant beams and gleaming light [...] the Mother of the eternal almighty, the Queen, powerful in Heaven, on land and at sea, whose divinity is deservingly venerated [and whom] every spirit and human being adores? We call upon you, Michael, Gabriel and Raphael, to pour upon her ears chaste vows and prayers for the holy Empire, for the Emperor Maximilian; may the omnipotent Virgin grant that he conquer his malicious enemies; may he restore peace to the people and safety to the lands. [...] the highest place belongs to Him by whom you were assumed, to whom you shine beautiful as the moon and are as excellent as the sun."

Later, around 1537–1538, Virgo prudentissima was rewritten by Hans Ott to be rededicated to Christ as Christus filius Dei (all Marian references were replaced) and Maximilian was replaced with his grandson Charles V, then the reigning emperor.

Moritz Kelber agrees with Rothenberg's interpretation of Virgo Prudentissima and its connection to the Feast of the Rosary. He adds that Maximilian considered the Virgin the patron of his reign and symbol of his march to Italy. The Marian symbols appeared notable not only in regard to the Reichstag at Constance but other occasions like Philip the Fair's funeral. Later, in the Reichstag of Augsburg (1548), his eldest granddaughter Mary of Hungary "appropriated" Marian symbols through music as well (in this case, the Virgin became associated with the ruler herself).

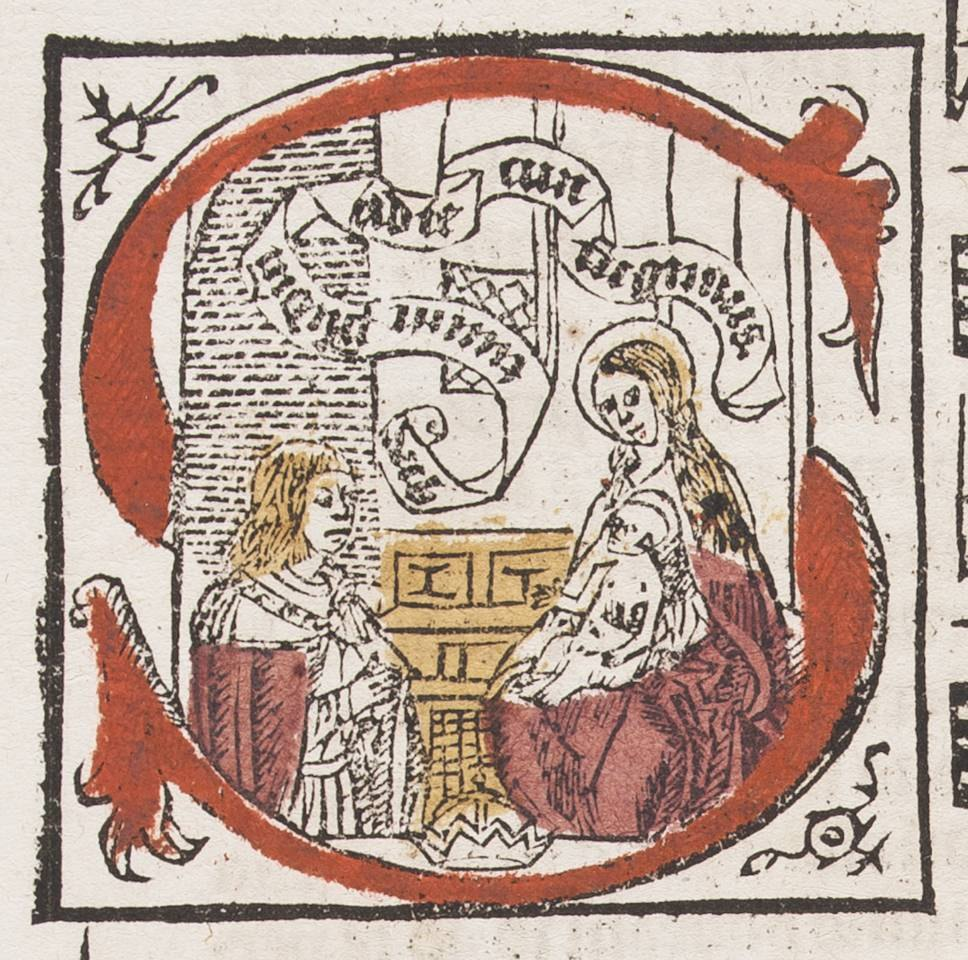
Illustration from the printed work Unio pro co[n]servatio[n]e rei publice (Antwerp: Jan de Gheet 1515), showing Maximilian singing the motet Summe laudis o Maria by Benedictus de Opitiis to the Virgin. Fol. Dv. According to Größing, he did have a beautiful singing voice with which he liked to entertain his grandchildren (and make them sing along). He sometimes sang along his chapel too – these people had to surround him in his campaigns, composed works and performed in the strangest (and dangerous) of circumstances, because he could not imagine a life without music.

The Virgin appears in other composers' works too, with some of the most notable being:

- Sub tuum presidium by Pierre de la Rue: The motet sets to music one of the popular Marian prayers ("under your protection and shield..."), which seemed to be particularly significant for Maximilian. In 1508, when he paid a splendid visit to Antwerp, he placed his activities under Her protection with this motet.
- "Summe laudis o Maria" by Benedictus de Opitiis: The motet was produced and performed for the same occasion in 1508. The text, composed by Petrus de Opitiis (brother of Benedictus) begins with a praise for the Virgin which is followed by a praise for Maximilian. reminiscent of Virgo Prudentissima's structure. Lodes notes that the son of Mary in the text does not mean Jesus alone (the son's name is never mentioned), but also Maximilian himself (similar to Obrecht's Missa Salve diva parens, mentioned below).

CMME's editor argues that the date of 1508 for these motets is not a certainty.

These motets were later printed in the Unio pro conservation rei publice (by Jan de Gheet, Antwerp, dated 1515), "eldest printed edition of polyphonic music in the Netherlands. It celebrates the visits of emperor Maximilian of Austria and his successor Charles V to the city of Antwerpen in 1508 and 1515".

- The Alamire manuscript VatS 160, a choir book sent to Pope Leo X as a gift and likely first made for Lord John III of Bergen of Zoom, presents Maximilian as the Saviour and the secular representative of God, and also contains numerous references to the connection between Mary of Burgundy and the Virgin Mary, based heavily on Molinet's literary "inventions".

The texts Populus qui ambulat in tenebris vidit lucem magnam (1477) and Le paradis terrestre (1486) are both allegorical texts used as the titles of chapters in Molinet's Chroniques. In these texts, Emperor Frederick III is compared to God while Maximilian is seen as the Only Begotten Son, who is sent to save the Burgundian nation and wed Mary of Burgundy. The Le paradis terrestre describes Maximilian's return to the 'Kingdom of the Father', where he was crowned as king of the Romans. The mass Missa Salve diva parens by the composer Jacob Obrecht (d.1505) declares: 'Hail divine mother of the lovely offspring, Virgin dedicated to the good things of eternity, through whom the true Light, God, shone upon the world, and the ruler of Olympus submitted himself to become flesh' ('Salve diva parens prolis amene, / eternis meritis virgo sacrata, / Qua lux vera, deus, fulsit in orbem / et carnem subiit rector olimphi'). According to van der Heide, here Mary (of Burgundy) and her Olympus (the Burgundian nation) is visited by the True Light (Maximilian). The mass was likely made to celebrate Maximilian's return to the Low Countries in 1508/1509. The mass Missa Ave regina celorum, also by Jacob Obrecht, is a tribute to both the Virgin Mary and Mary of Burgundy. Here, Mary became the deceased heavenly Mother, Friend and Queen of Emperor Maximilian.

Silver notes that Maximilian's vision of religious music was not the simple result of sacral precedents seen by him in the chapels of the Low Countries, but tied to his militancy, his self-image as a martial ruler and the strong right arm of the Christian faith. Alexander the Great and Caesar were great sources of inspiration for him in music, as he said himself in the Weisskunig. Professor Nicole Schwindt notes that in his time, "this convergence of military heroism and artistic sensibility was a new profile for a ruler, which was not universally accepted and still had to be legitimized by citing Aristoteles." Beyond political representation, this reflects on Maximilian as an individual who turned to music for deeper aesthetic desires as well.

- The song Innsbruck, ich muss dich lassen is usually associated with the memory of Maximilian, written by Isaac, although the legend that the emperor was the lyricist was now considered highly unlikely. The song can be found in early collections such as Liederbuch Ludwig Iselins (Ludwig Iselin's Songbook). The song Bentzenower (no.54) in this book is about the fight against Maximilian of Hans Pienzenau, the commander of Kufstein who was later executed after Maximilian took the fortress in 1504.
- The ballad Fraulein von Britannia, appeared in 1491, tells the story of Maximilian and Anne of Brittany. Michael Mullet comments that the ballad is "royalist soft pornography", but portrays rulers as actual people.

=== Armour and weapons ===
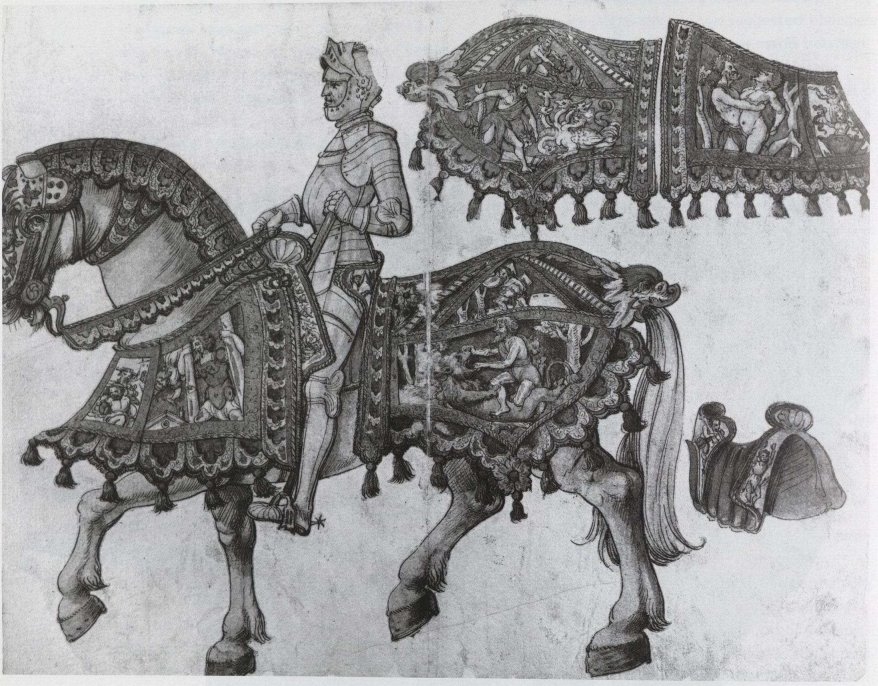
Drawing of the bard depicting the stories of Hercules and Samson, c. 1517–1518 (Madrid). Thun-Hohenstein album.

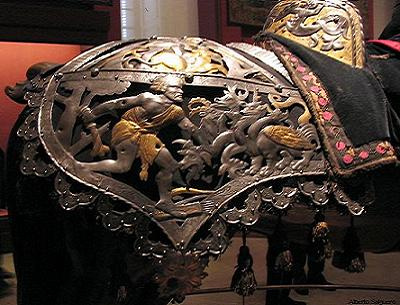
Detail of the Madrid bard

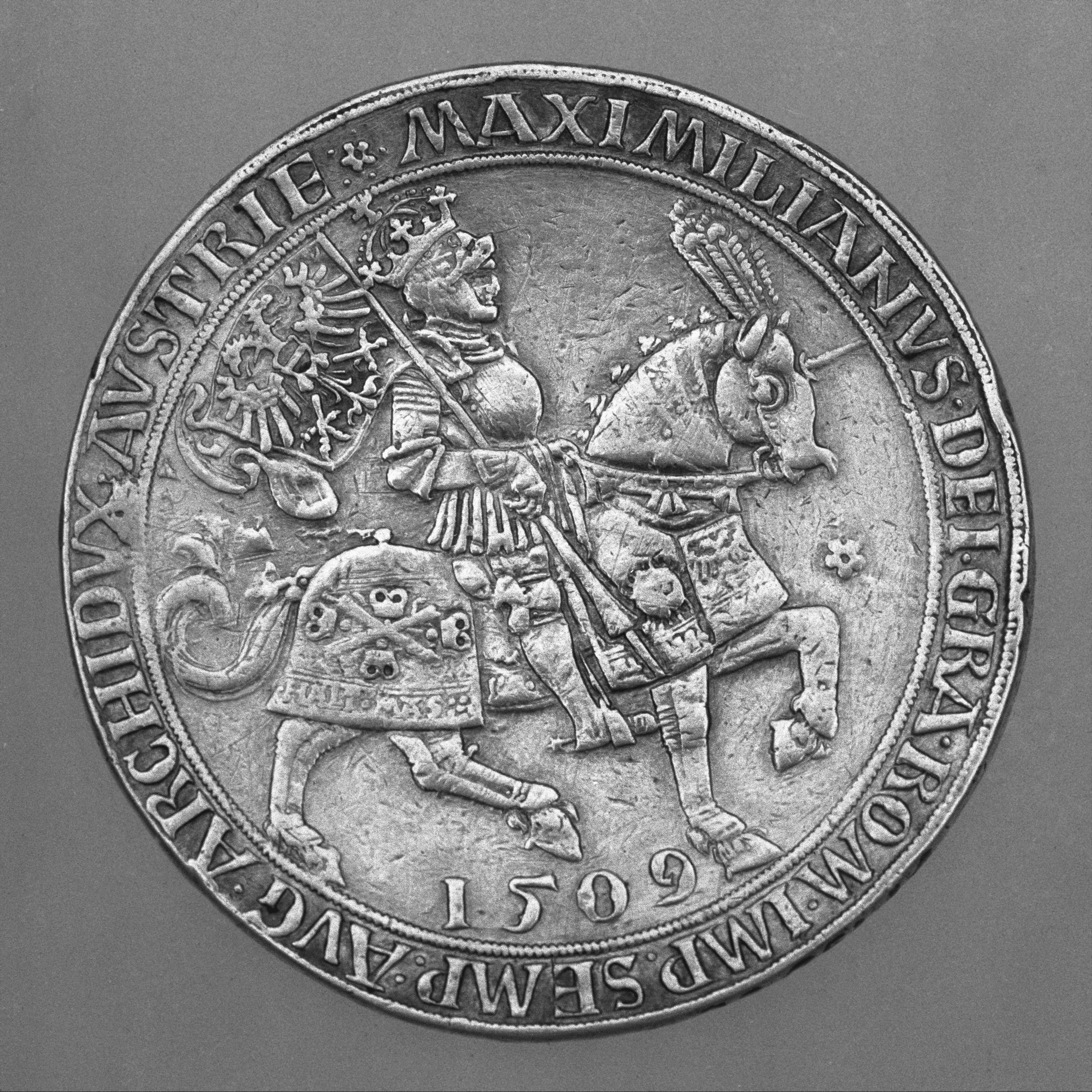
Doppelguldiner, issued in Antwerp, Burgundian Netherlands, in 1517; dies cut in Hall, Austria in 1509. The image shows Maximilian riding a fully armoured horse. The crupper shows a central knob and devices that Maximilian adopted after his first marriage like the Burgundian cross, a repeated inscription shows the motto of the Order of Temperance (Halt mass). Both the armour Maximilian wore and the equine armour were likely based on real armours possessed by Maximilian, with the bard most likely from Lorenz Helmschmied, but both do not survive.

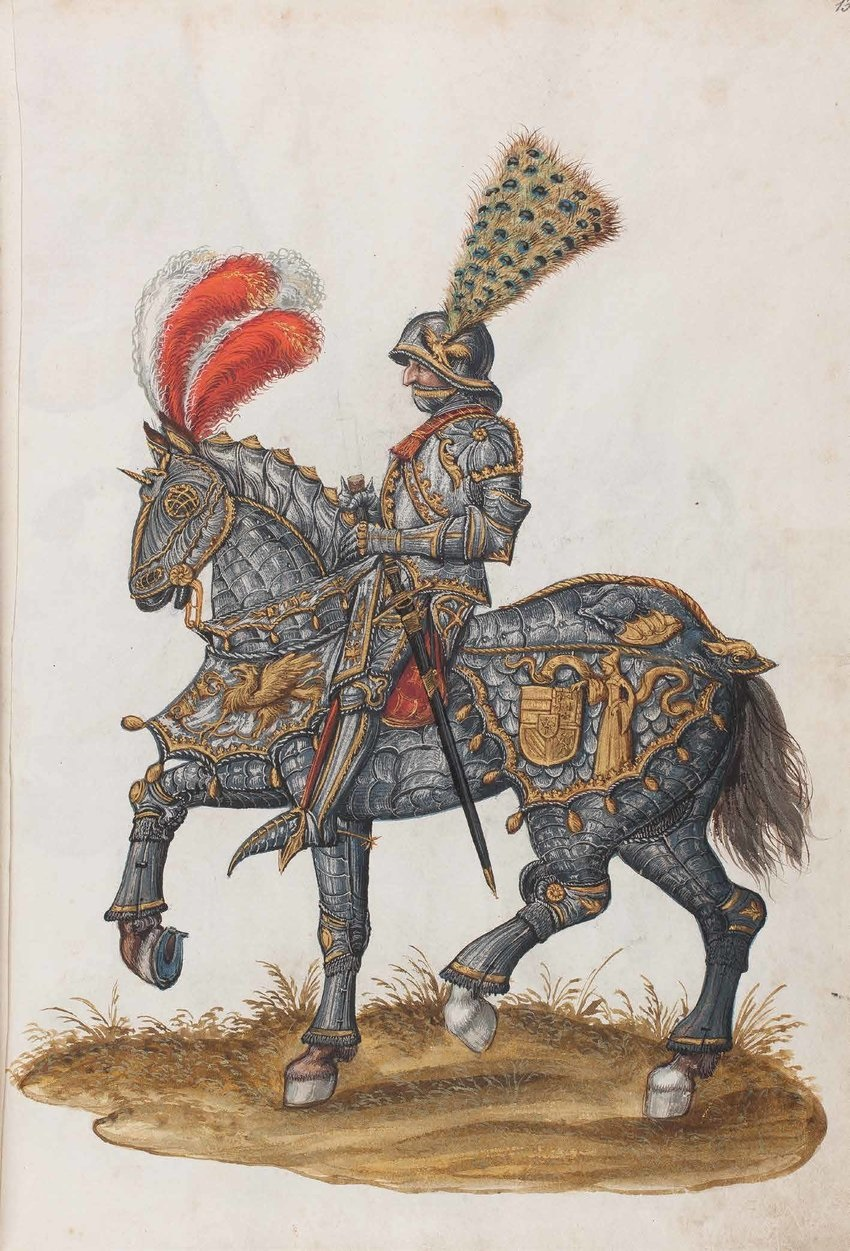
Maximilian I on an armored horse, ca. 1575, from Eine Reihe von in Farben zum Theil schön ausgeführten Bildern, Herzog August Bibliothek, Wolfenbüttel.

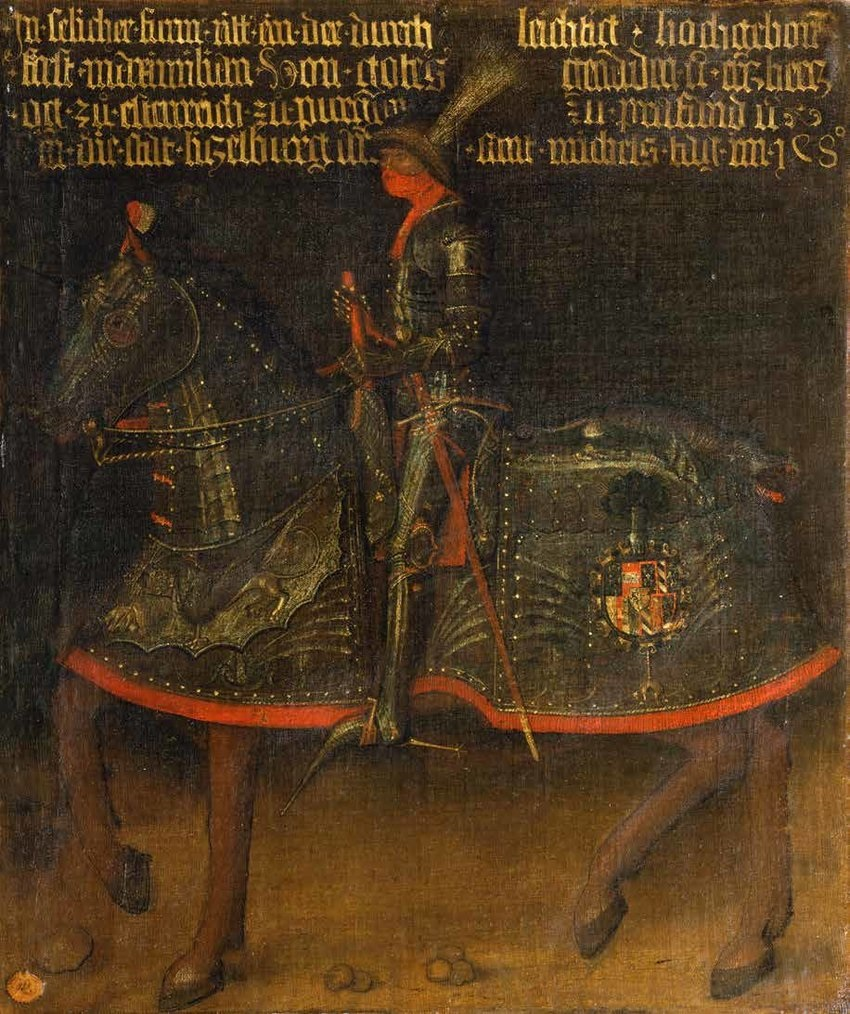
Maximilian entering the newly reconquered Luxembourg, 1480. The bard is by Lorenz Helmschmied.

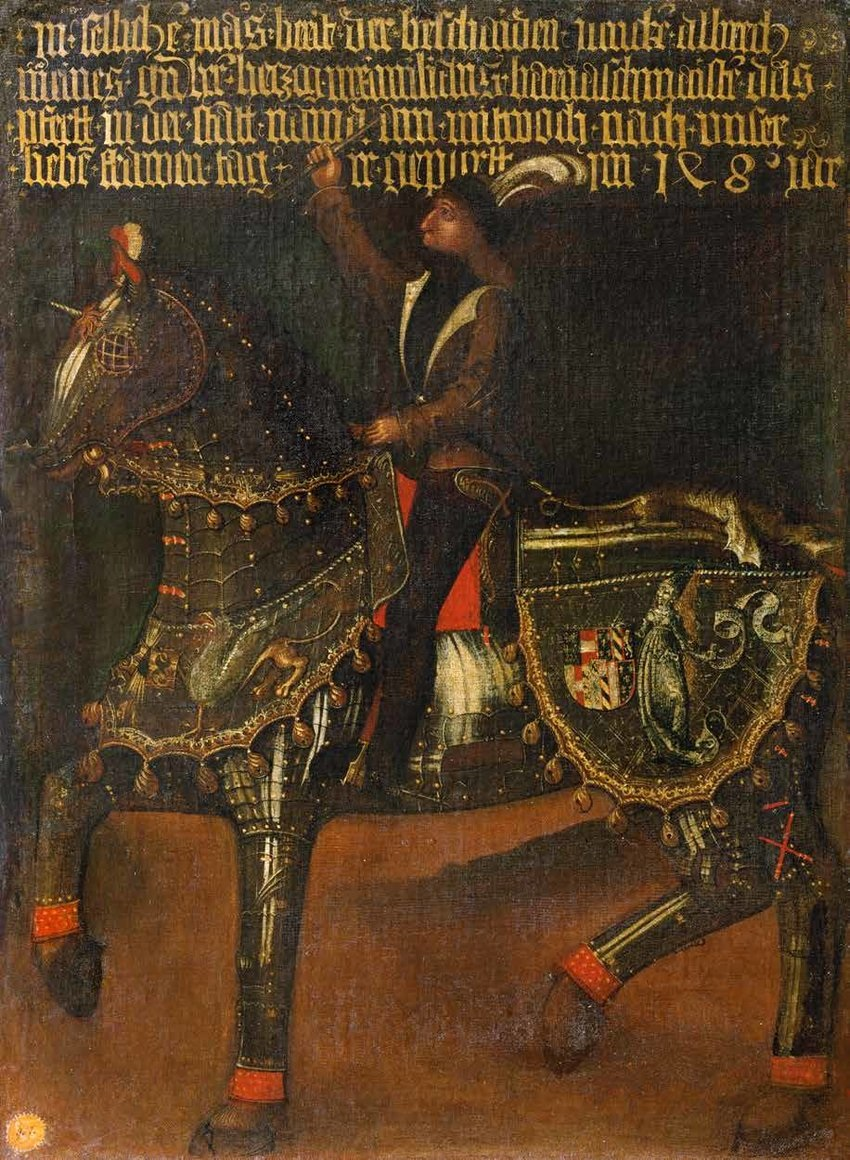
Albrecht May, Master-of-Arms, entering Namur, riding a horse wearing Maximilian I's bard in 1480. The bard was crafted by Lorenz Helmschmied. The female figure is likely Mary of Burgundy herself.

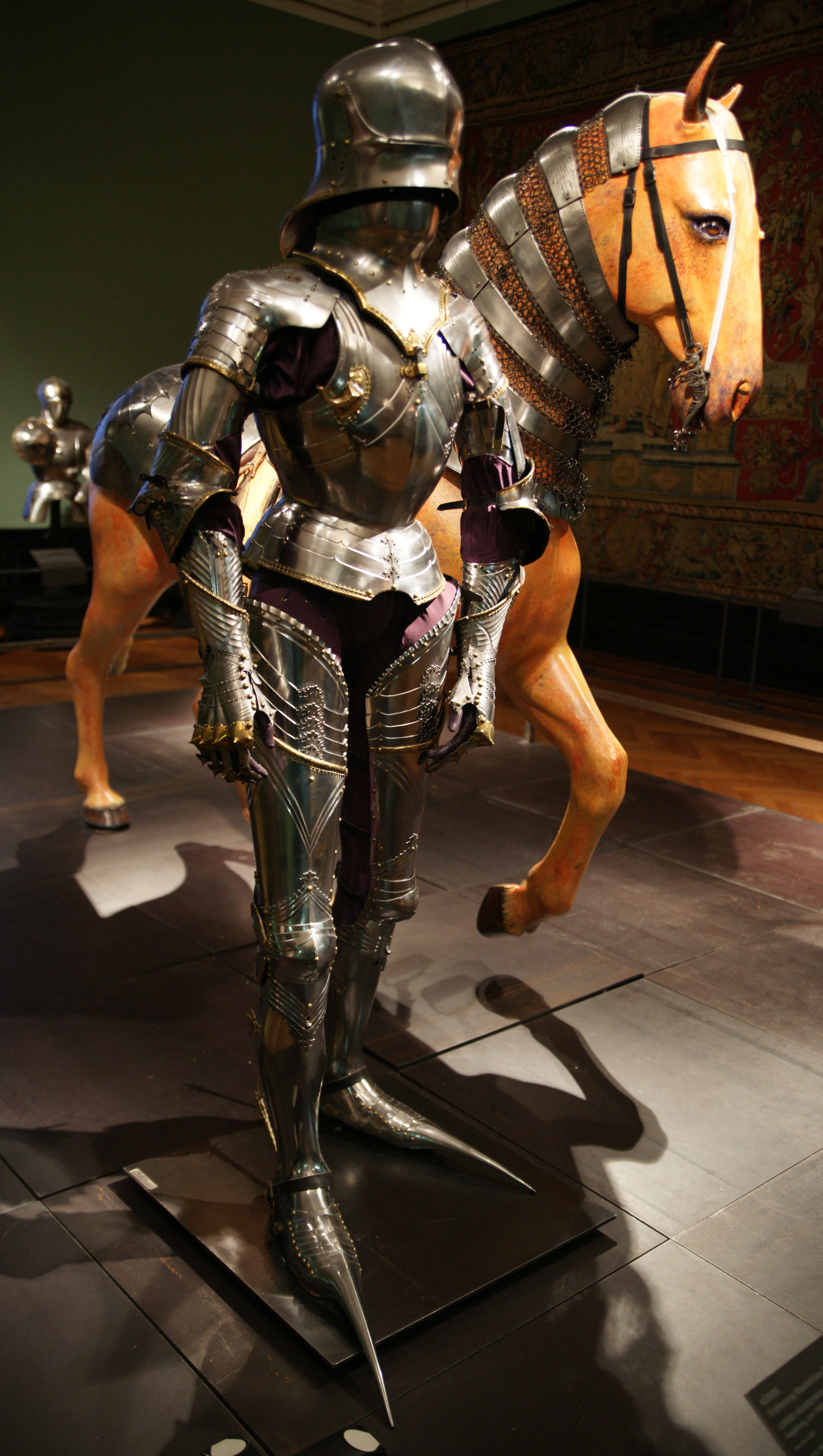
Gothic-style plate armor used in the triumphal entry in Luxembourg (as seen in the previous image), also likely wore by Maximilian at Guinegate (1479), according to Pierre Terjanian

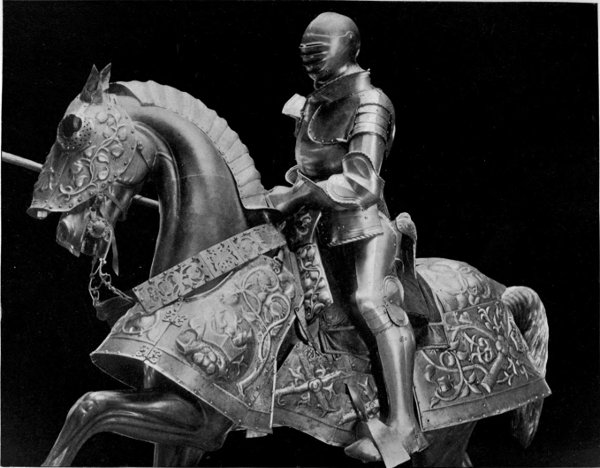
The so-called Burgundian bard (1510), now in the Royal Armouries. Originally made for either Maximilian himself or Philip the Handsome, then presented to Henry VIII. The bard consists of a shaffron, a crinet, a peytral, a crupper, flanchards, reins and saddle steels. The embossing and etchings show "the firesteels and raguly crosses of the Burgundian Order of the Golden Fleece, and pomegranates, the badge of the House of Aragon, and Maximilian's personal emblem. The entire surface was silvered and at least partly gilded". The armourer was the Netherlander Guillem Margot and the artist responsible for the etching and gilding was his compatriot Paul van Vrelant, who later moved into Henry VIII's service.

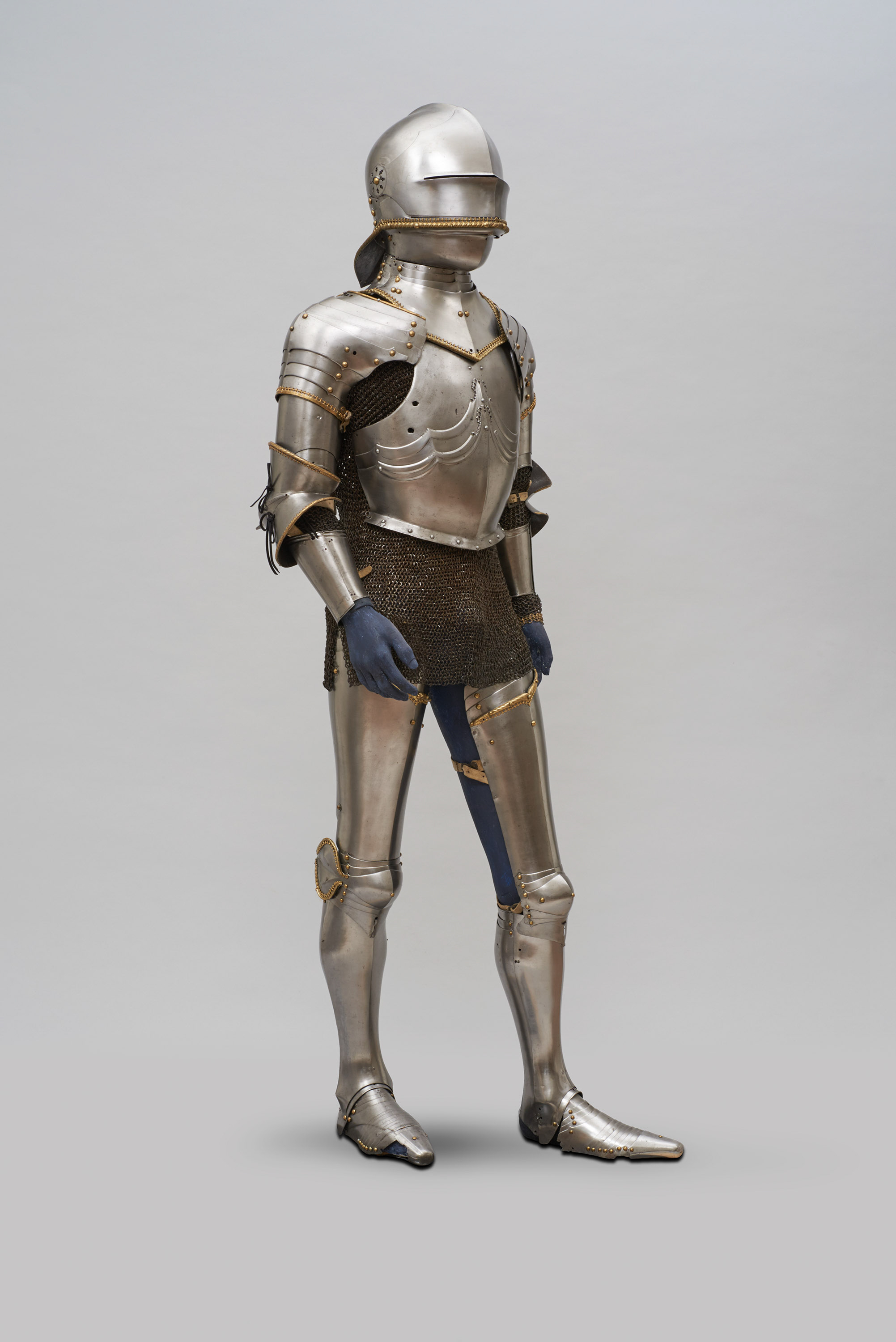
Gothic armour of Maximilian. Lorenz Helmschmied, 1493.

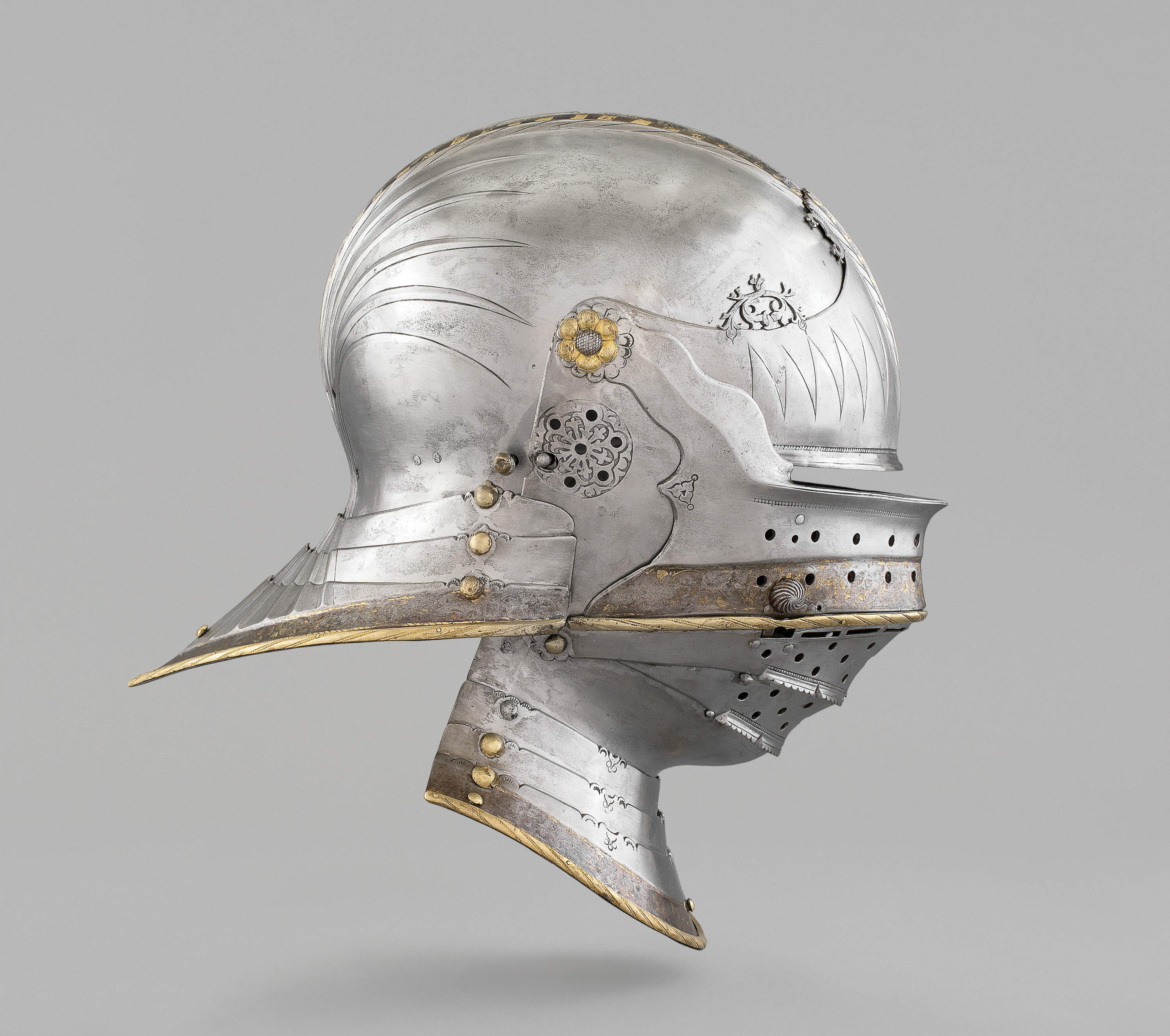
Close sallet of Maximilian. The notable feature is that the helmet and the bevor are joined together. Lorenz Helmschmied, 1495.

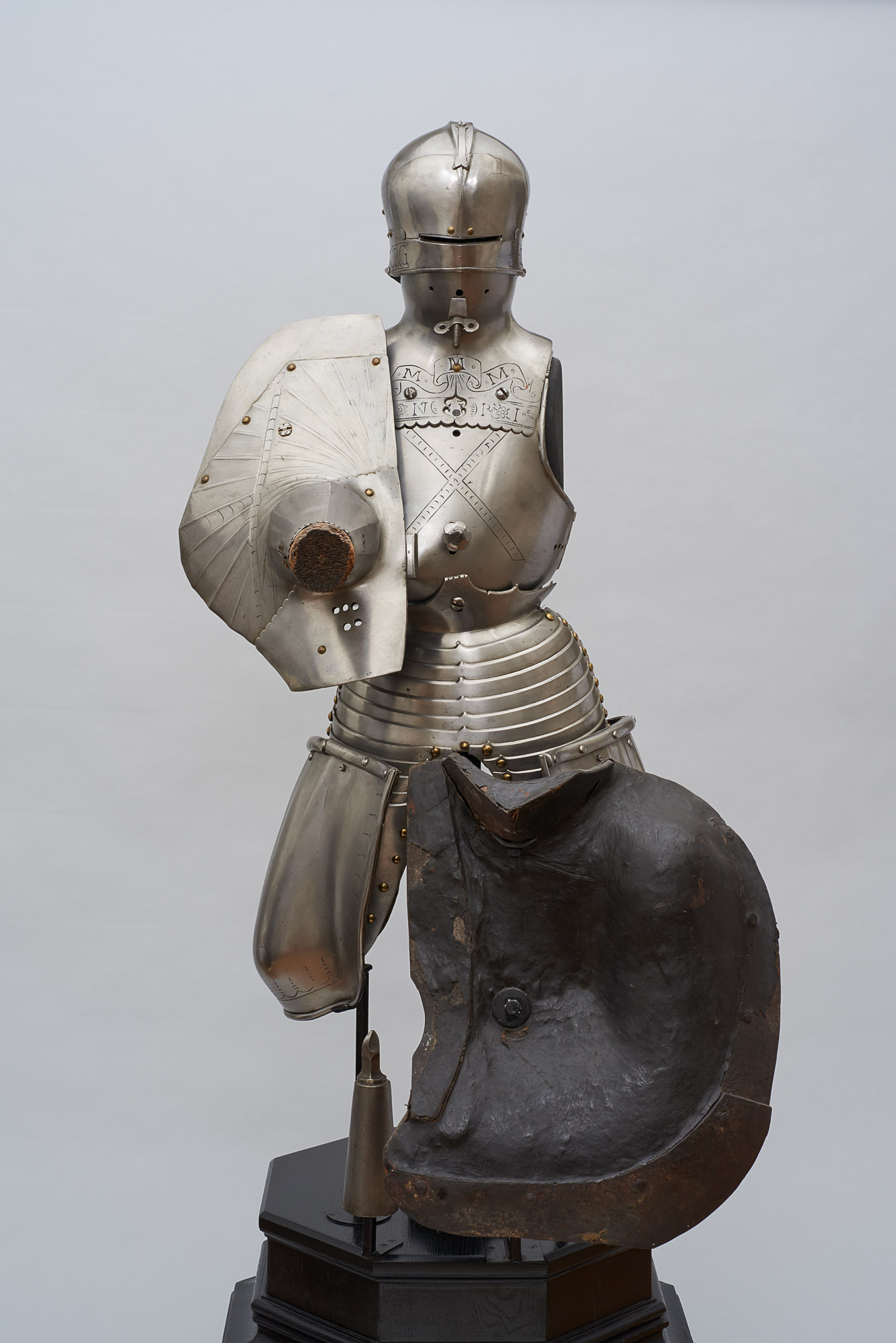
Racing armour of Maximilian. Lorenz Helmschmied, 1500.

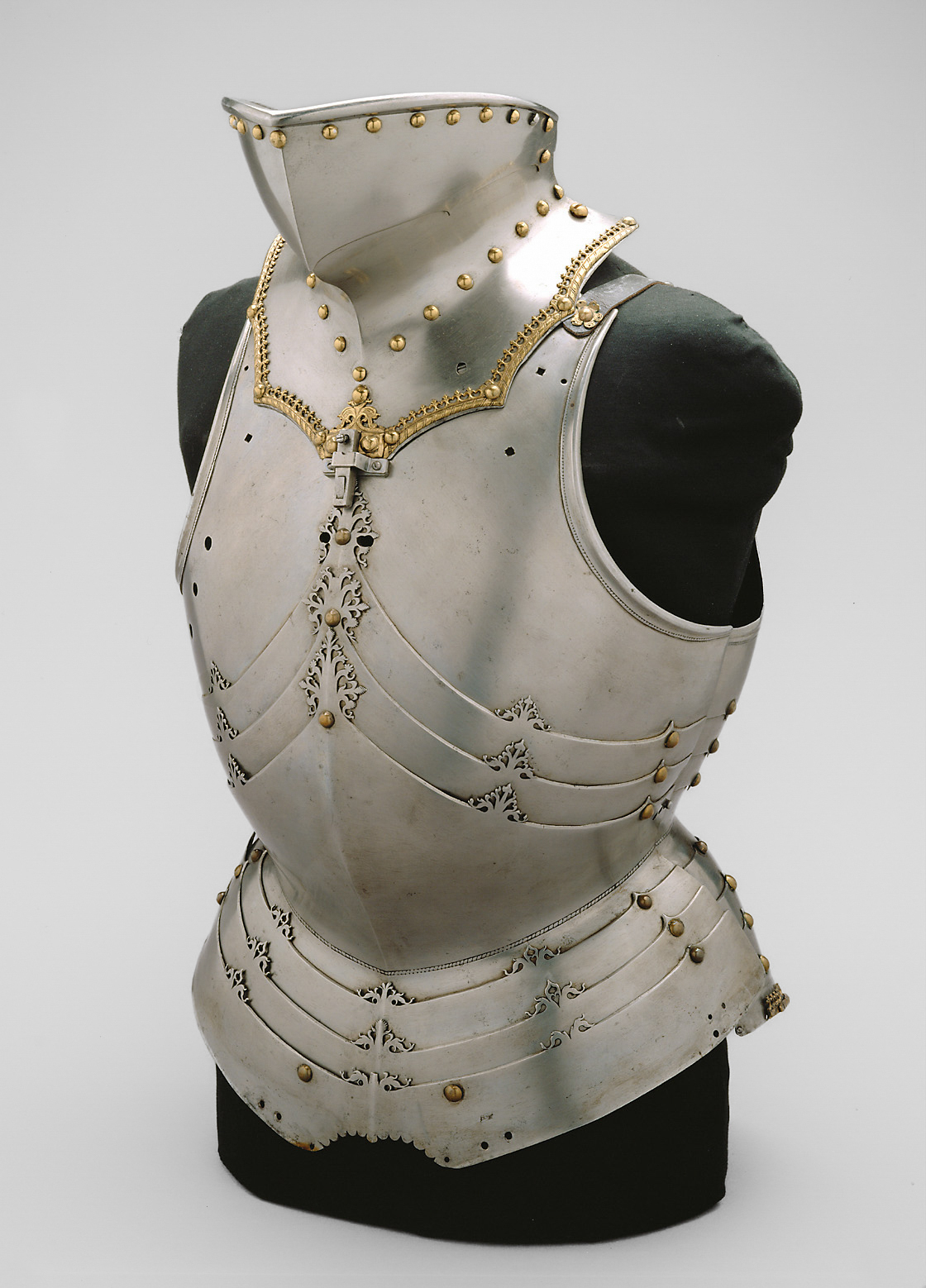
Cuirass of Maximilian. Lorenz Helmschmied, 1485.

The ancient hero Hercules and the Biblical figure Samson were also favourite figures of the emperor and identified with him through different mediums of art. According to Silver, "Hercules, then, is a perfect pagan parallel to St. George or to the biblical lion slayer, Samson, illustrated later in the Prayerbook by Breu. Hercules and Samson also shared the parallel of being undone by women."

- Frederick the Wise commissioned a suit of armour for Maximilian. The armour depicted images of Samson and Delilah, the Idolatry of Solomon, Judith with the head of Holofernes, and Phyllis and Aristotle. According to Jacqueline Q.Spackman, "The inclusion on male armor may have been a warning to the man wearing the armor that even the mightiest and most intelligent of men (in this case Emperor Maximilian) can be seduced or tricked by women."
- There's a bard (now in the Royal Armoury in Madrid), usually identified as made by Kolman Helmschmied and originally belonging to Maximilian, before being inherited by Charles V. The figures of Hercules, here shown performing Labours of Hercules, is an allegory for Maximilian himself. Samson is shown with Delilah. The bard was once accompanied by a suit of armour that depicted the same subject.

The extremely elaborated and innovative bards crafted by Lorenz Helmschmied were important as iconographic and propagandic devices for Maximilian in his Burgundian years, as the horse wearing his bards served as living banners for the master even when he could not be present himself. Maximilian utilized the technological expertise of Augsburg, renowned for its innovative wonders and automata, for his bards that, in combination with equine and human performances, would produce optical and technological marvels corresponding to the Burgundian entremets for the Burgundian viewers. Kirchhoff writes that, "In its most luxurious iterations, horse armor did far more than protect an expensive and extensively trained steed. It transformed the animal's body into a moving sculpture and a communicative surface upon which to inscribe the iconography of power. In the case of the bard now in Vienna, the crupper plates that encase the horse's flanks form imperial double eagles that are enlivened by etched feathers and emblazoned with an escutcheon bearing the arms of Austria. The corresponding crupper shown in images of the 1480 entries uses the marshalled heraldry of the Habsburg and Burgundian dynasties, supported by a figure that resembles the duchess herself, to declare the consolidation of Mary and Maximilian's power [...] No surviving equine armor approaches the technical and visual ambition of the articulated bard, and the Helmschmids are the only armorers known to have created matrixes of steel plates flexible enough to encase a horse's entire lower body as it moved. Indeed, this type of armor became associated with Maximilian, who continued to commission bards that covered horses' legs and bellies to arm his own steeds and also as diplomatic gifts to forge alliances and demonstrate Habsburg power." The recipients of these bards included Sigismund I the Old, who was presented with "two coursers all covered with steel to the fetlocks and the belly, save in the spurring place". Another case was Henry VIII's so-called Burgundian bard.

- The bard shown on the 1517 Doppelguldine, like the armour Maximilian wore, displays the fluting technique associated with Maximilian armour. It is known that there was connection between the development of the full bard Maximilian armour and the Landsknecht.

Surviving examples of the parts of armour crafted specifically to cover the horse's legs are very rare. The most remarkable case is an element made for a horse's forearm or gaskin, decorated with the fluting technique and etched bands that display the style of Daniel Hopfer of Augsburg, the inventor of the metal etching technique (circa 1470—1536). This part is preserved in Brussels's Musée Royal de l'Armée et d'Histoire Militaire (10212). It is dated around 1515 and most likely made by the Helmschmid workshop.

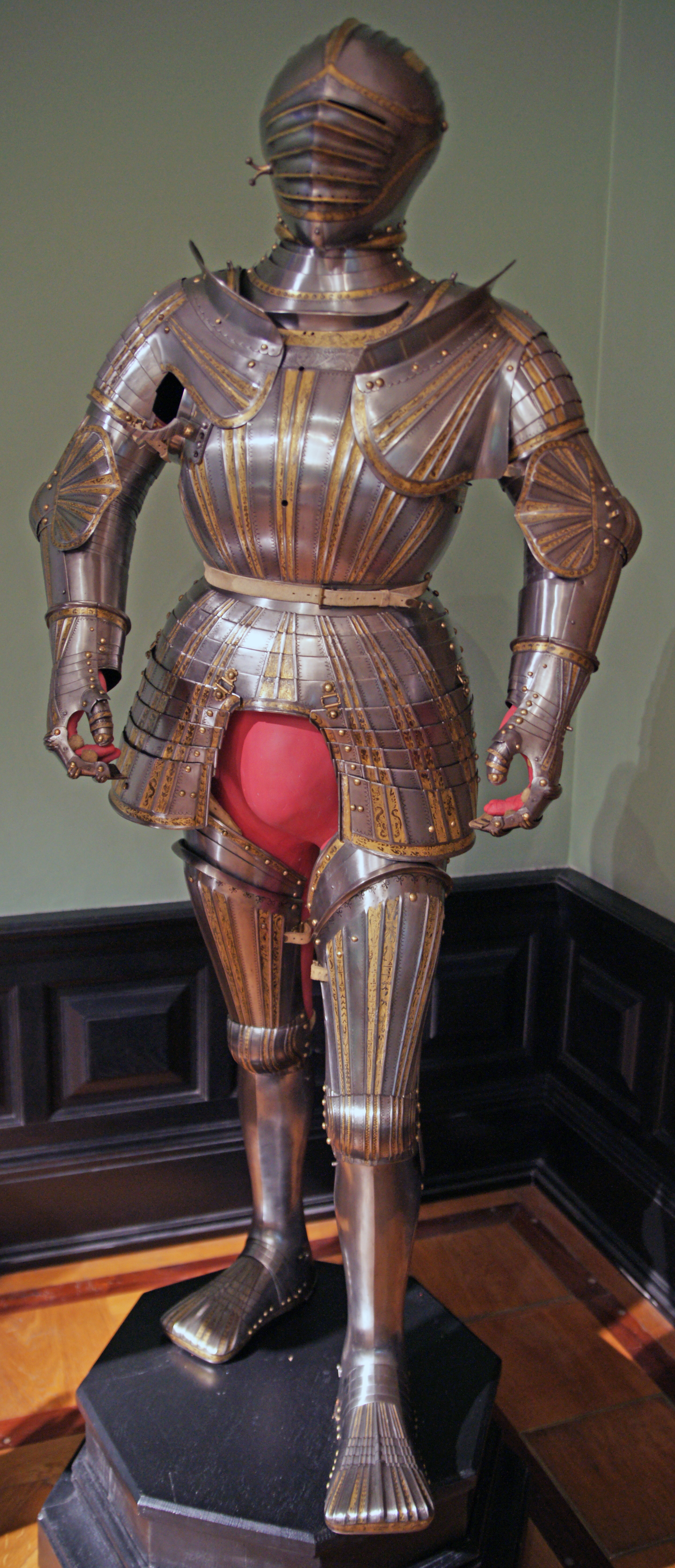
Armour, likely a gift from Maximilian to Matthäus Lang

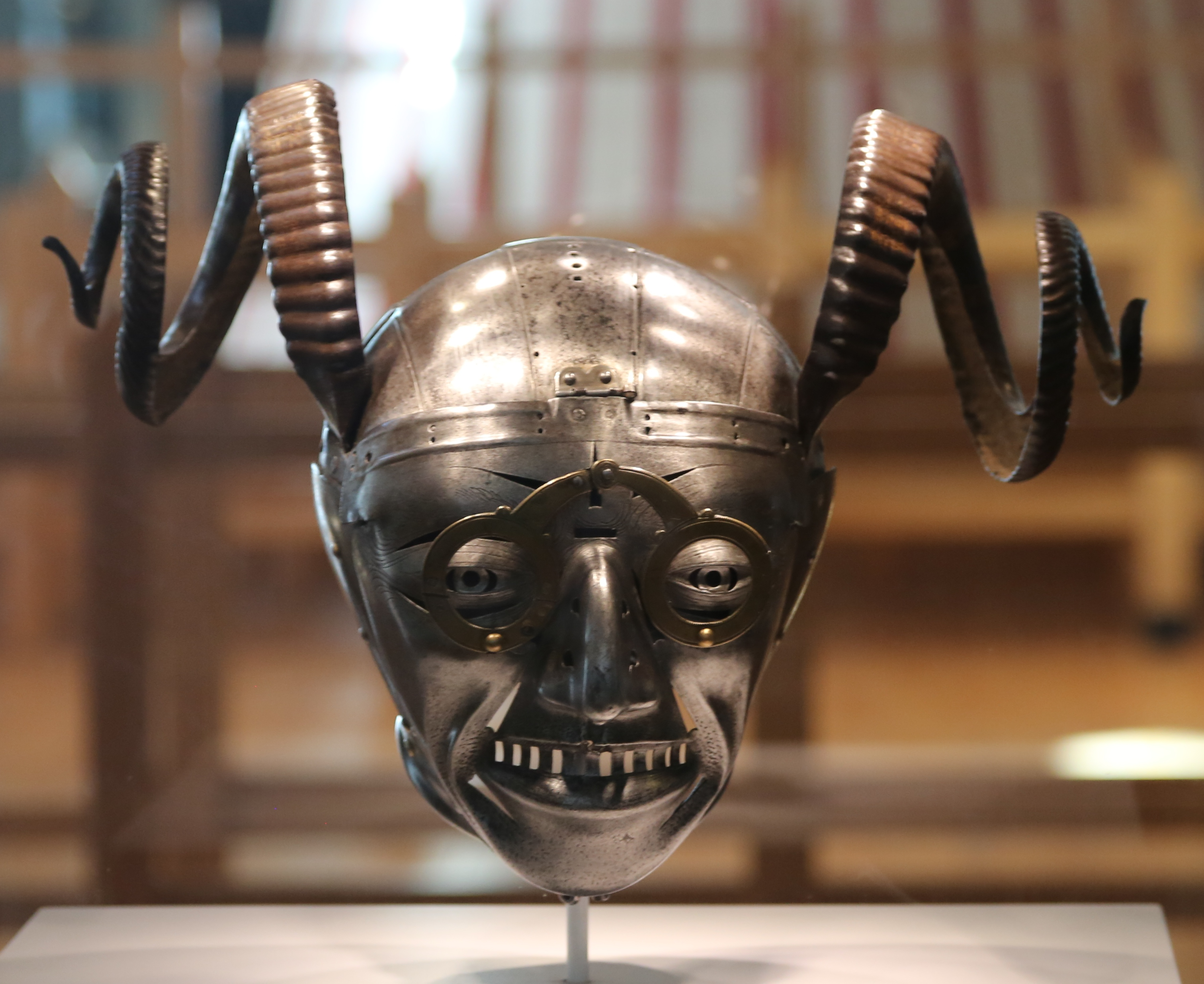
Horned helmet, part of an extremely luxurious pleated skirt armour that was crafted first by Seusenhofer and then sent to Augsburg to be plated with gold and silver. The face is possibly a caricature of Maximilian himself. This was a gift to Henry VIII.

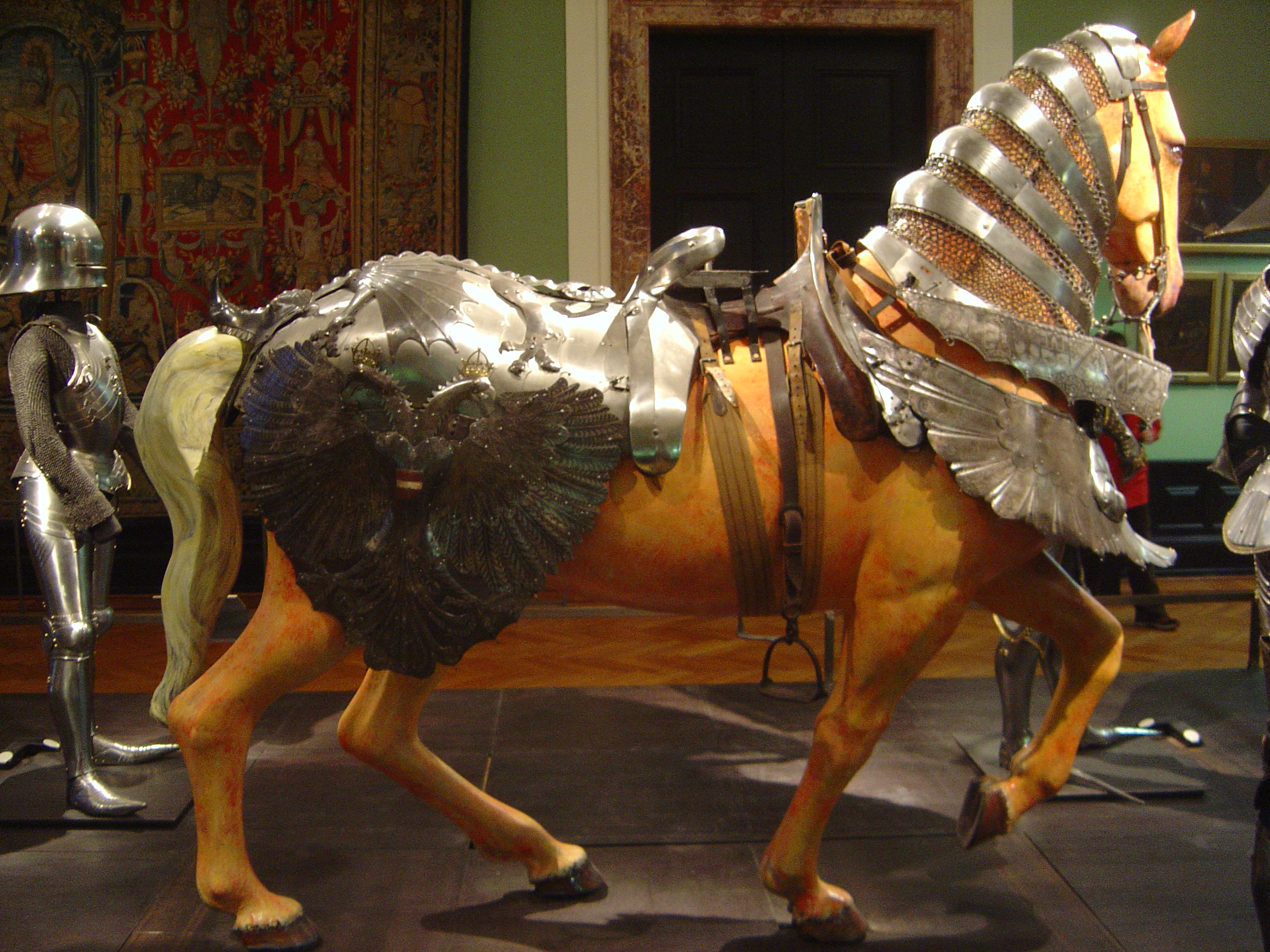
Fragments of the bard made by Lorenz Helmschmied and Konrad Seusenhofer for Frederick III, also used by Maximilian. As the parts are interchangeable, he seemed to have reattached this bard's imperial eagle cruppers to parts from other bards for a procession in Strasbourg on 31 August 1492, described by the Venetian diplomat Andrea Franceschi as "horse armored from head to foot – an extremely glittering sight!". According to Franceschi's letter, "the animal's breast was emblazoned with two griffins and on each of its flanks was the imperial eagle."

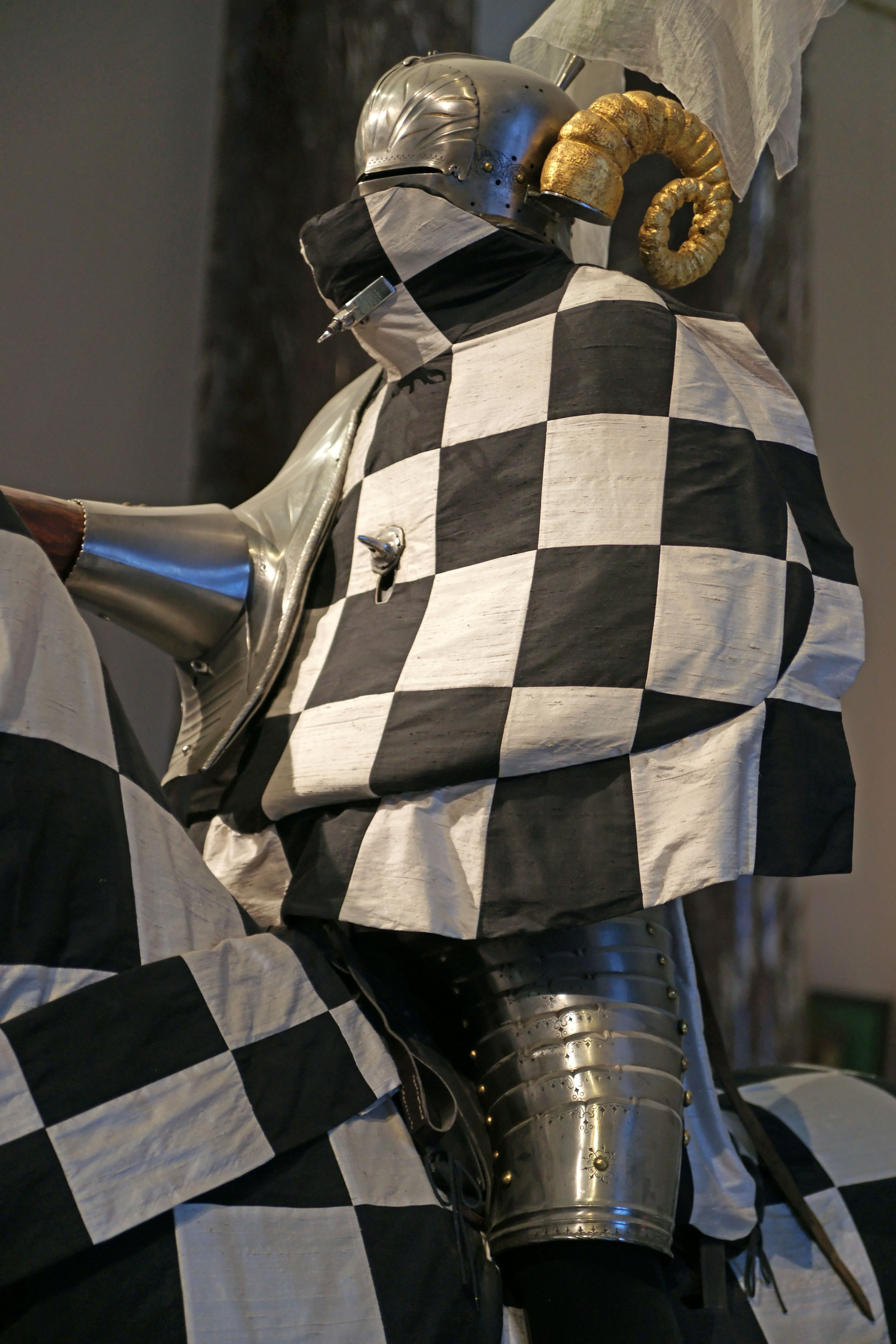
Racing armour. The racing helmet has reinforcing forehead plates; the massive, specialized shield (covered with modern fabric), which is bolted to the breastplate and bevor, and the lance's semicircular shield create a combination that protects the uncovered hands and arms.

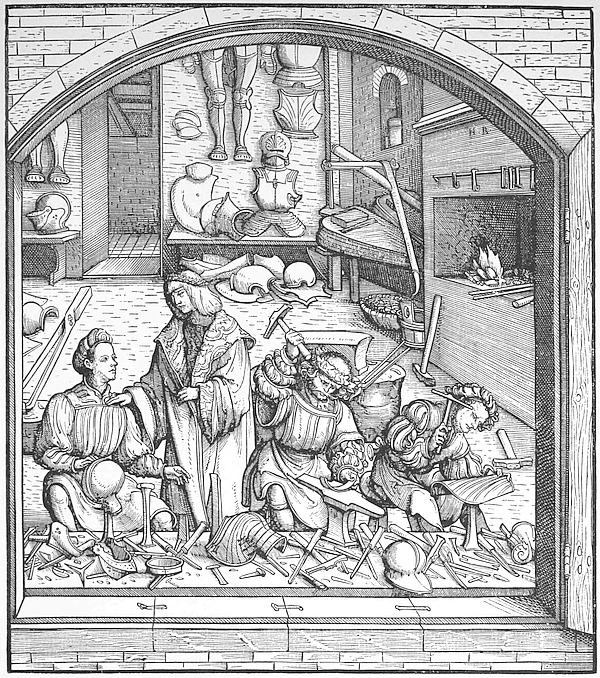
Maximilian I visits Konrad Seusenhofer's workshop, "Weisskunig" (circa 1514–16)

Konrad Seusenhofer was the leading representative of Innsbrucker Plattnerkunst.

In Innsbruck, Maximilian inherited the legacy of Sigismund of Tyrol, who also loved high quality armour and had patronized armourers in the nearby Mühlau, who produced works that were sent as gifts by Sigismund to rulers in Hungary, Portugal, France, Scotland and Silesia.

Insbruck's arms production was geared towards quality rather than quantity. The city could not compete with Augsburg and Nuremberg in mass producing war armour. Other than Seusenhofer, another favourite master of Maximilian was Hans Laubermann, "the wealthiest armorer in Innsbruck".

A particularly exotic invention of Seusenhofer was the pleated skirt armour, which required exceptional skill to deal with metal the same way as with fabric. According to the MET, "the base was an imitation in steel of the cloth skirt that was sometimes worn over armor. The deep, arched cutouts in front and back allowed the wearer to sit on horseback; the close-set holes along these openings were for the attachment of textile decoration, probably fringe. The etching imitates the elaborate embroidery and cut velvet of fashionable court costume." Works of this type contributed to Seusenhofer's status as Maximilian's favourite armourer for donations. A notable example was the harness made for Charles of Burgundy (future Charles V) in 1512-1514.

The Maximilian armour style was likely originally conceived to "create a dazzling effect as sunlight reflected on its polished, rippling steel", although it turned out that the flutings strengthened the defensive capability of the armour. The flutings also might have been designed to imitate the pleatings of costumes in the late 15th century.

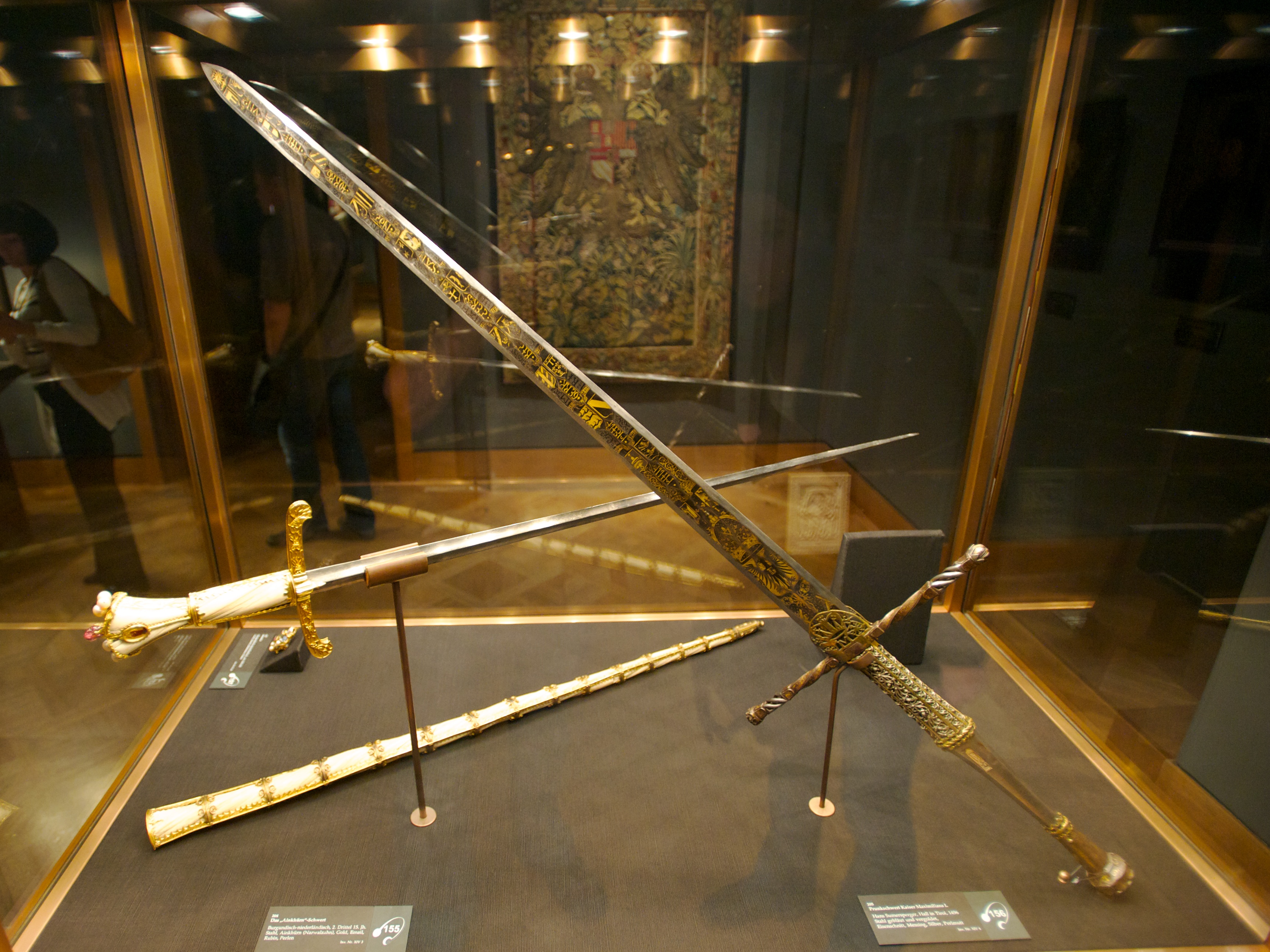
The ceremonial sword of Emperor Maximilian I (front) (Sumersperger, 1496)

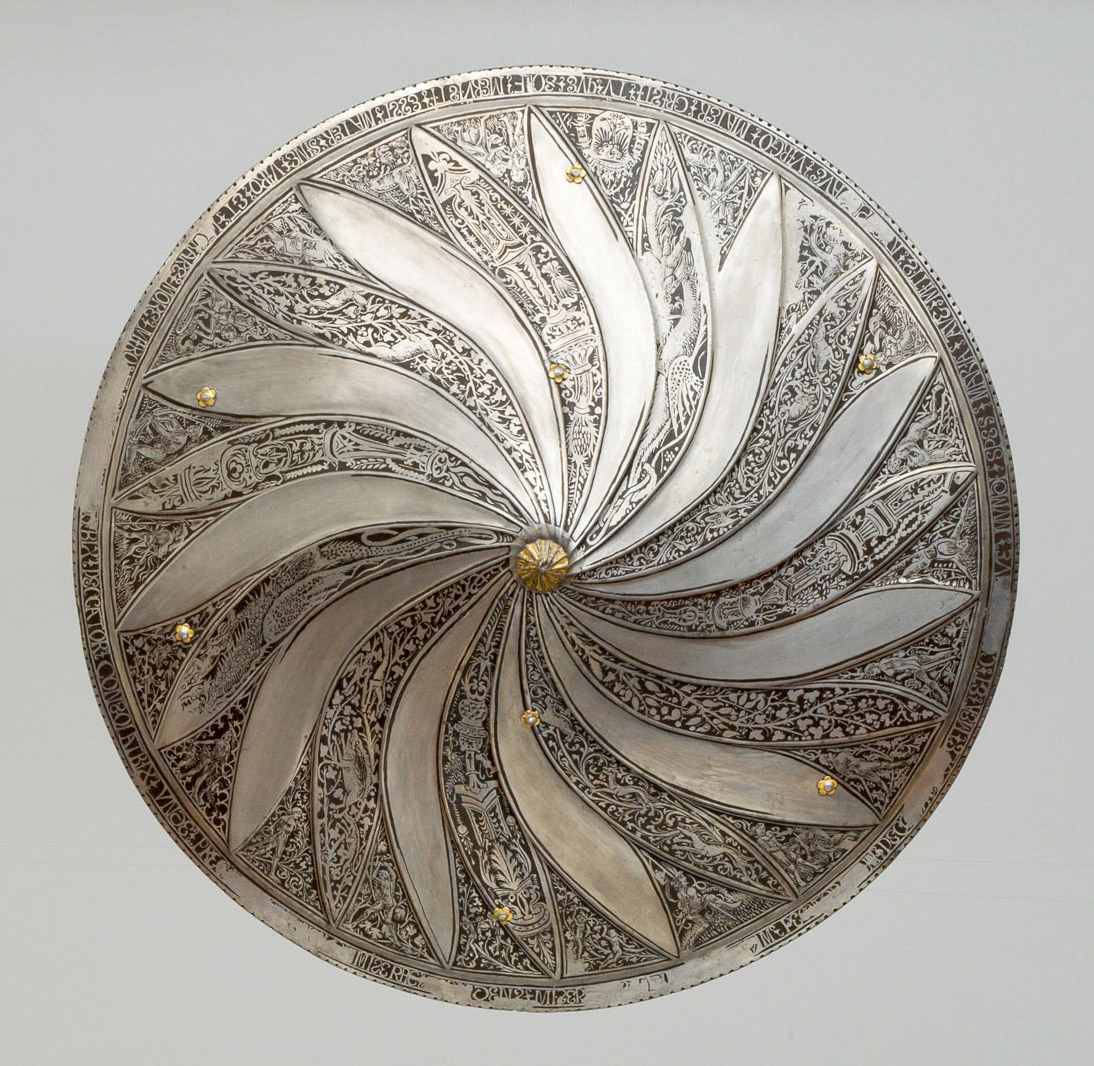
Round shield of Maximilian, anonymous artist.

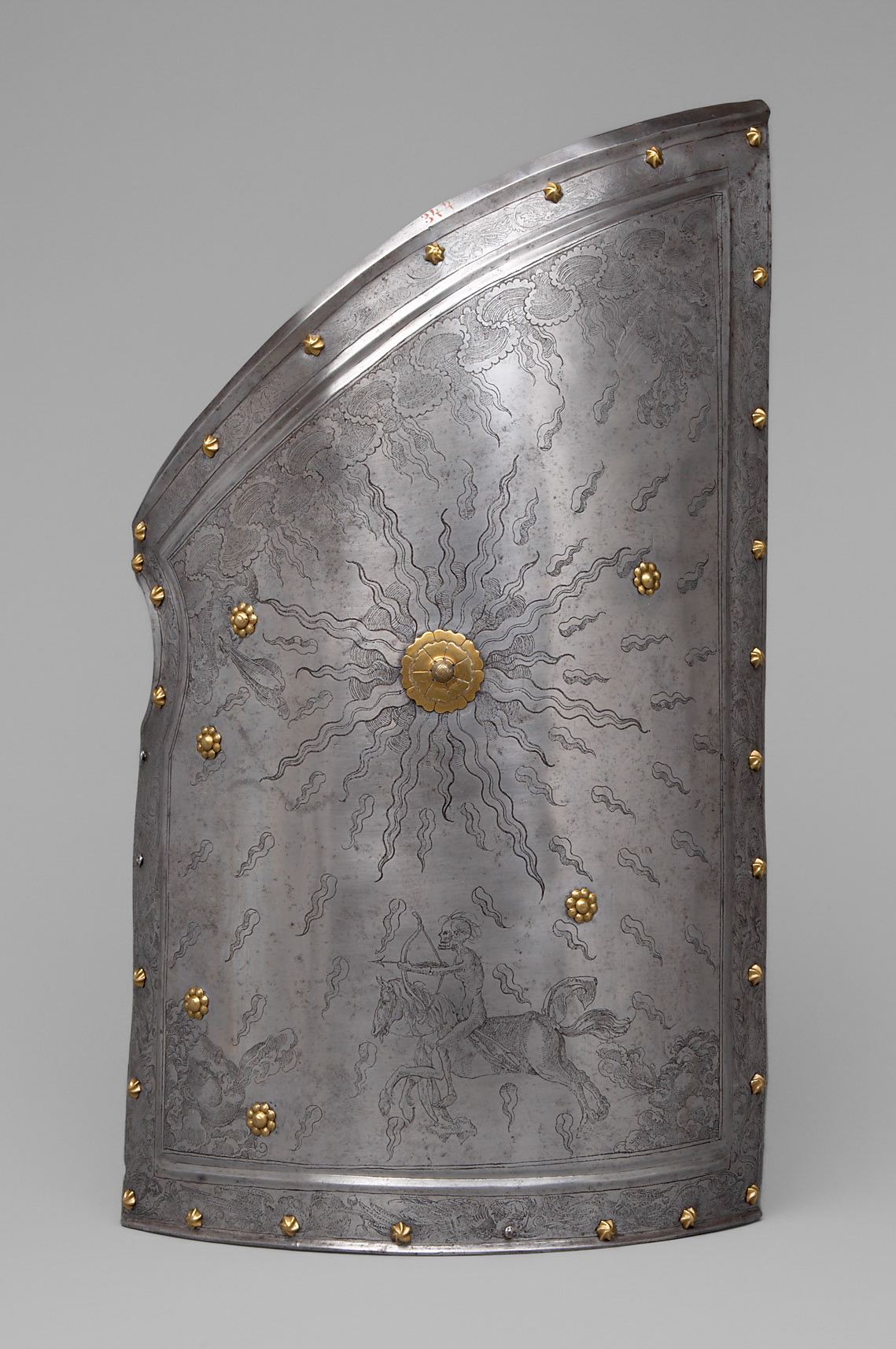
Hungarian shield of Maximilian (1515, Innsbruck), ©KHM-Museumsverband

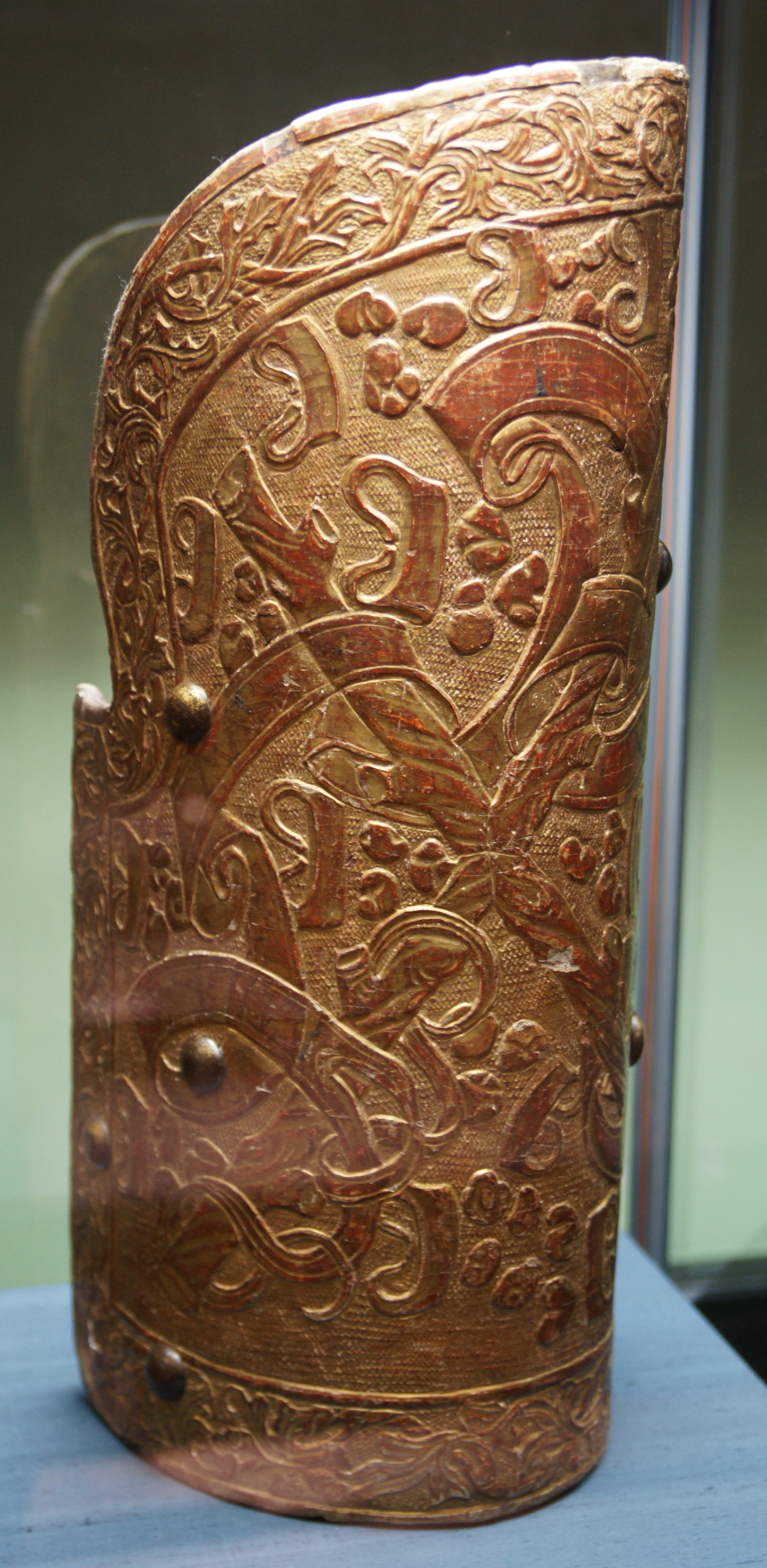
Hungarian shield of Maximilian, Kunsthistorisches Museum Vienna

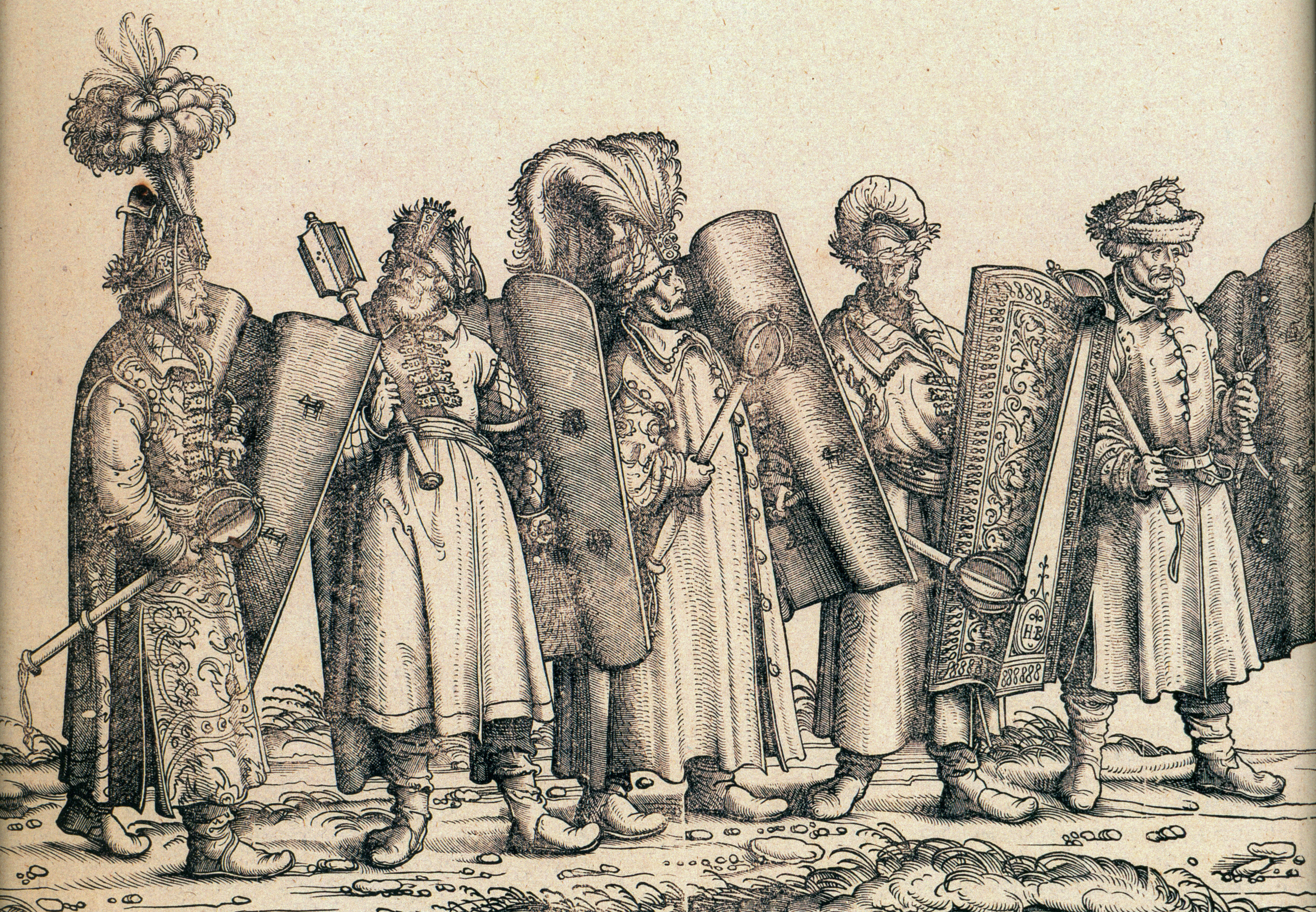
Hungarian nobles carrying Hungarian shields in the Triumphal Procession

Swords (see External links), knives, crossbows, cannons and other weapons were an artistic and propagandistic medium to Maximilian as well, although the audience here is more limited.

- A blued steel ceremonial sword (Prunkschwert), made by Hans Sumersperger (1492–1498) in Tyrol in 1496, opulently decorated with heraldic symbols and selected personal saints (one side is Saint George; the other is the Virgin) "was designed to be read from the tip of its blade back to its hilt, thus oriented clearly toward the sovereign who extended it in a ritual-like dubbing". Lhotsky notes that the Mary side shows more prestigious symbols, associated with higher ranked territories (kingdoms and duchies). Silver connects the heraldry seen here to those of the Wappenturm.
- The hunting sword (Hirschfänger), also with blued steel and made by Sumersperger in Tyrol, shows the Mother of God on one side, standing on a crescent moon and crushing the serpent. The other side shows Saint Sebastian (also a patron of Maximilian, as the saint of soldiers and archers) being tied to a trunk and pierced by arrows. There are carved mother-of-pearl figures of a saint on the handle, presumably Barbara or Catherine.
- The round shield of Maximilian, now in Kunsthistorisches Museum in Vienna, was made around 1505. The single-headed eagle indicates that the date of creation was before Maximilian's 1508 coronation, and the style of decoration was before Daniel Hopfer made the breakthrough that unified the "heterogeneous world of motifs of the earlier period in the spirit of the Renaissance." A recent restoration allows the shield's pictorial wealth, unparalleled for its time, to be observed. The text of the motet Ave mundi spes Maria (there are differences in comparison with the version seen in the Codex Mus. Ms. 3154 in the Bavarian State Library, Munich, usually called the Choir book of Nikolaus Leopold) frames the shield, with the sentence "Mattheo Gurcensi episcopo dedicatum" (referring to the powerful official Matthäus Lang, then Bishop of Gurk) appearing several times. This motel seems to have played an important role in the court culture. The decoration shows diverse scenes that do not have one heterogeneous theme: there are scenes that represent masculine virtues and activities (fencing scenes, wild man fighting against a bear, Saint George defeating the dragon unicorn fleeing a hunter and running towards the lap of a maiden etc.) contrasting with scenes representing male weakness and female dominance (Phyllis and Aristotle etc.), scenes of heroic poeatry and love narratives (Tristan, Lancelot etc), dancers, man being hanged upside down, etc The animals (chamois, deer, stags, dragons...etc) and certain decorative motifs like the elaborated candelabra seem to have developed from models seen in French-Burgundian and Netherlandish tapestries or Italian and German arts.
- The Hungarian shield (1515, Innsbruck) combines the style of Albrecht Durer and the Danube school with 15th century influence.

==== Maximilian's inventory books ====
Maximilian commissioned a series of inventory books that record important information about his arsenals. These books called Zeugbuch, serve the aesthetic purposes as well. The Vienna manuscript is the most famous one. A Zeugbuch recently discovered in Munich, Cod. icon. 222, "contains extensive information on the armament kept at approximately 100 locations – from castles and towns to monasteries and fortified churches – within the historical Slovenian territories."

=== Tapestries ===
- Legend of Notre Dame du Sablon (or Our Lady of the Zavel) tapestries, commissioned by Franz von Taxis (1459–1517), circa 1518, with design attributed to Bernaert van Orley, features the scene Franz von Taxis was bestowed the postal rights by Frederick III according to Maximilian's arrangement.

== Posthumous depictions in artworks and popular culture ==
After Maximilian's death, generations of Habsburg rulers looked up to him as a model for their patronage and continued his artistic legacy. Hugh Trevor-Roper writes that, "By harnessing the arts, he surrounded his dynasty with a lustrous aura it had previously lacked. It was to this illusion that his successors looked for their inspiration. To them, he was not simply the second founder of the dynasty; he was the creator of its legend – one that transcended politics, nationality, even religion."

In the eighteenth century, Maximilian transformed from a dynastic symbol representing the Habsburgs to a national symbol for Germany. The Weisskunig was rediscovered and got its first edition in 1775. Herder saw his era, which he shared with other heroic figures like Albrecht Dürer, Martin Luther and Paracelsus, as the great German era, the most important one since the Romans, and the source of European constitution. In the nineteenth century, his story was re-stylized as "key moments in the German-Austrian self-image". Under the influence of both Romanticism and Historicism, his image took on many new directions.

=== Poems ===
- In 1519, after the emperor's death, the Swiss poet Ceporinus wrote On the good life and apotheosis of Emperor Maximilian I in commemoration of him.
- Maximilian's daughter Margaret also wrote a poem in commemoration of her father after his death.
- Threnodia, a 1519 in commemoration of Maximilian's death by Pierre Gilles, is the author's best known Latin poetry work.
- In Sigmund von Birken's 1657 Ostländischen Lorbeerhäyn, a paean to the House of Austria, Maximilian, a "male Pallas", represents the "duality of the sword and the quill". Christina Posselt-Kuhli notes that the poet was influenced by the image promoted by Maximilian and collaborators in his projects, which was the manifestation of a successful strategy combining political self-representation with cultural values.
- Austrian writer Caroline Pichler (1769–1843) wrote the poem Max I. und Maria von Burgund about Maximilian and Mary.
- Alexander Fischer (1812 – 1843) wrote the ballade Kaiser Max und Albrecht Dürer in 1842.
- Heinrich Döring (1789–1862) wrote a poem of the same name.
- Conrad von Rappard wrote the poem "Kaiser Maximilian" about the duel of Maximilian and Claude de Vaudrey.
- Eberhard im Bart by Carl Grüneisen (1802 – 1878) is a poem that recounts how Eberhard defended the dignity of Württemberg in a feast attended by Maximilian and other princes.
- In 1830, Anastasius Grün (11 April 1806 – 12 September 1876) published the epic poem Der letzte ritter (The last knight), with which this epithet has become almost the second name of the emperor, which is now the only aspect many Germans know about him.
- Henry Wadsworth Longfellow's poem The Belfry of Bruges mentions the wedding by proxy of Mary of Burgundy and Maximilian, and the end of his imprisonment in Bruges, when he was forced to swear not to take vengeance on the rebels: "I beheld proud Maximilian/Kneeling humbly on the ground". He is also mentioned in Nuremberg.

=== Plays ===
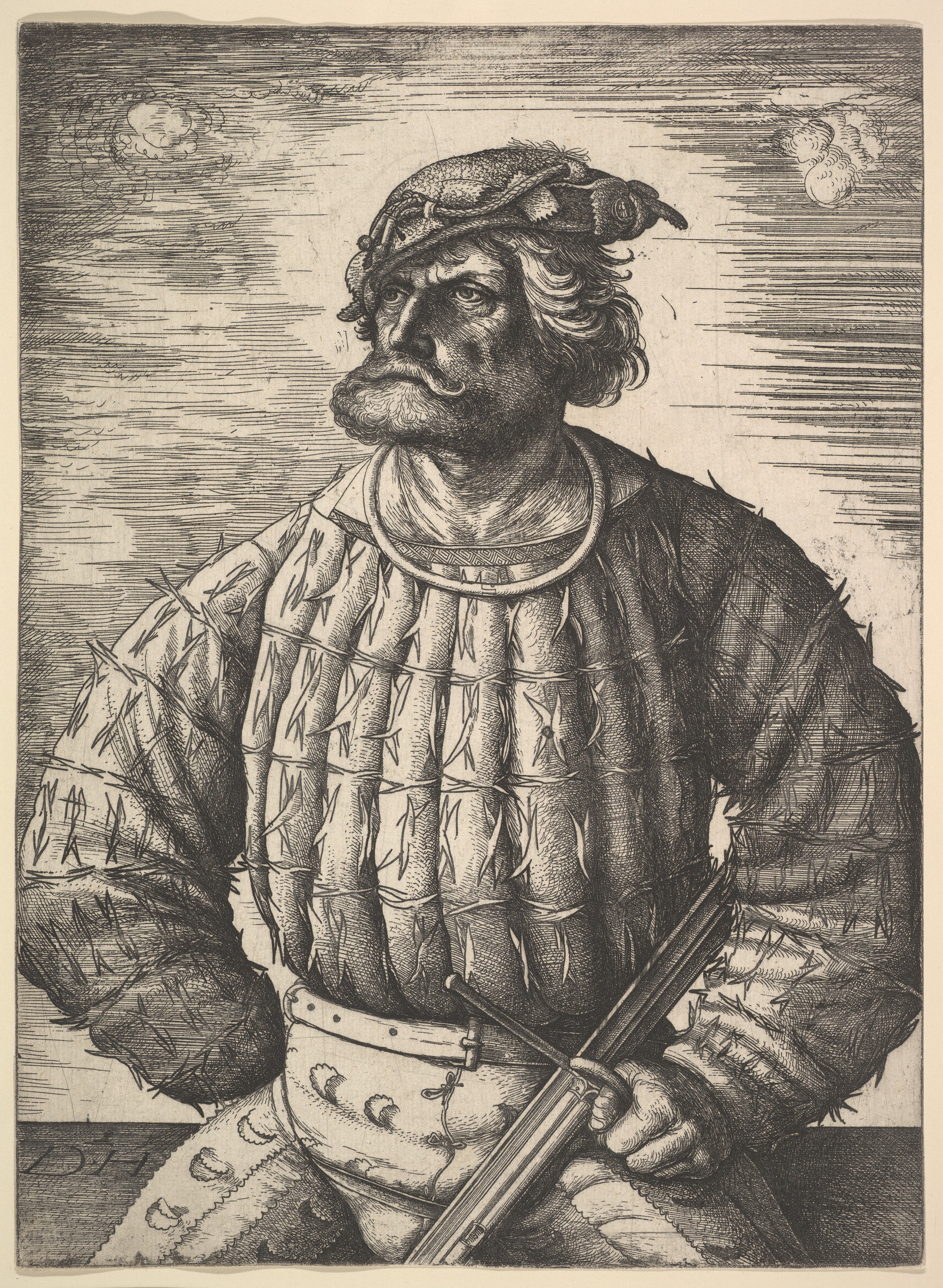
Portrait of Kunz von der Rosen, who was Maximilian's jester, adviser and friend. He appeared with the emperor in many works produced by later writers. This portrayal, a copy of Daniel Hopfer's etching, makes Hopfer the person credited with being the first to make etched plates for printing purposes.

- Pedro Calderón de la Barca's 1649 play Austria's second glory drew upon the Martinswand legend and raised it to an allegory of personal trust in God. On that year, the actor Augustín Manuel de Castilla was released from debtors' prison in Segovia so that he could play the young Maximilian.
- Goethe's 1773 Götz von Berlichingen presents Götz von Berlichingen as the true Last Knight, in the place of Maximilian, who was revered by Götz despite being unable to control his anarchical realm. Stepan Shevyryov praises Goethe's genius for daring to give Maximilian a minor role and elevating Götz to the center.
- He was a character in Ludwig Rellstab's 1824 five-act Karl der Kühne. Other important characters include Charles the Bold (titular character), Archduke Siegmund, Mary of Burgundy.
- In Johann Ludwig Deinhardstein's Hans Sachs (1827) (which seems to be the inspiration behind Richard Wagner's Die Meistersinger von Nürnberg), Maximilian came to Nuremberg incognito and helped Hans Sachs, a talented minstrel of humble origins, to marry the woman he loved.
- In 1835, Anton Pannasch wrote the dramatic poem Maximilian in Flandern, describing events from the death of Mary of Burgundy to the revolt of Flander (including the imprisonment of Maximilian in Bruges). Other characters include Kunz von der Rosen, Cuspianian, Paul von Liechtenstein, Georg von Frundsberg, Philip the Fair and Margaret.
- Gustav Freytag's 1844 play Die Brautfahrt oder Kunz von den Rosen (The bridal procession, or Kunz von den Rosen) is a comedy about Emperor Maximilian, which won the author the Berlin Court Theater Prize.
- Richard von Kralik's 1913 Der letzte Ritter (The last Knight), originally named Maximilian, is a play about the young Maximilian and seems to be a response to Goethe's Götz von Berlichingen.
- Maximilian – ein wahrer Ritter is a 2019 musical written by Florian and Irene Scherz about Maximilian and Mary of Burgundy.
- In the 2019 musical Schattenkaiserin, which is about the tragical life of Empress Bianca Maria Sforza, Maximilian is portrayed as a cold, adulterous husband who married Bianca for money and then abandoned her to focus on wars, other lovers and extravagant pursuits.The authors are Jürgen Tauber und Oliver Ostermann. The musical received three nominations for the German Musical Theatre Prize 2020/21 (due to the coronavirus crisis, the price covers both the 2019/2020 and 2020/2021 seasons) for composition, stage design and costume and won the prize for stage design.

=== Fight books ===
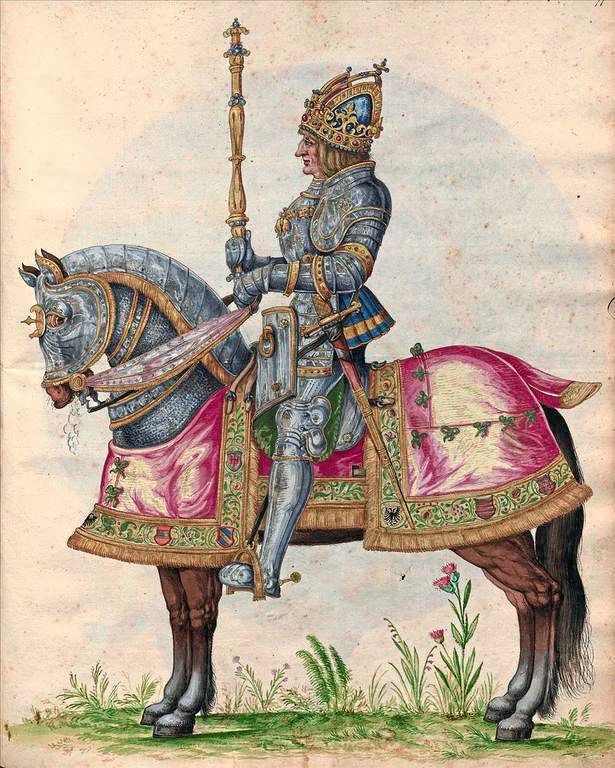
Maximilian in the Tournament Book of Maximilian I. Photo: Österreichische Nationalbibliothek.

- The Thun-Hohenstein Album (Thun'sche Skizzenbuch) is a collection of 112 drawings created from the 1470s to about 1590 (with the majority produced in Augsburg in the 1540s) and rediscovered by Pierre Terjanian in 2011. The images display armoured figures in combat and at rest. It continues Maximilian's culture of remembrance and shows his successor Charles V as heir of a potent martial lineage.
- The Tournament Book of Maximilian I (Turnierbuch Maximilians I.) is a tournament book created in the early 17th century and still not researched in depth. While the book depicts the emperor twice, the content is about the tournaments in Maximilian's time, rather than Maximilian directly. The second part is an armour book.

=== Novels and other prose works ===
- In one of the imaginary dialogues written by the satirist Trajano Boccalini (1556 – 16 November 1613), Maximilian explained his opinions about Islam to the God Apollo, who chaired the debate. According to Maximilian, the introduction of Islam was a matter of policy and Mohammad was more of a politician than a sacred man. Apollo decided that Maximilian's opinions were entirely correct.
- Cinthio's Hecatommithi (1565) is the chief source for Shakespeare's Measure for measure. Maximilian corresponds to Duke Vincentio and the story happens in Innsbruck (Innsbruck functioned as imperial capital city under Maximilian I), instead of Vienna.
- Maximilian is an important character in the 1866 novel The Dove in the Eagle's Nest by Charlotte Mary Yonge.
- In 1858, F.C.Schall published the historical novel Kaiser Maximilian der Erste in Wels und die Polheimer: Historischer Roman.
- The Kaiser's tree by Wilhelmine von Hillern (1836–1916) is about the story of Hans Liefrink (Hans Liefrinck is a well-known block cutter) and Mailie, who met Maximilian once when they were young and planting a tree. Hans talked about his dream of becoming a wood carver like Dürer and marrying Mailie.
- Hieronymus Rides: Episodes in the Life of a Knight and Jester at the Court of Maximilian, King of the Romans is a 1912 novel, written by Anna Coleman Ladd. The story is about Hieronymus, a jester and knight, who served his half-brother Maximilian loyally and undertook many adventures.
- Maximilian is the central character of Peter Prange's 2014 novel Ich, Maximilian, Kaiser der Welt.
- Des Kaisers Narr ist in Gefahr: Meine Reise in die Zeit von Kaiser Maximilian I. is a 2018 children fiction, written by Verena Wolf and Sonja Ortner and illustrated Christian Opperer. The story is about two children who time-travel with a court jester to Maximilian's era.
- In the 2019 novel Die Luftvergolderin. Ein historischer Roman by Jeannine Meighörner, twelve-year-old Anne of Bohemia and Hungary married Maximilian (then aged 56) and became a widow, before finding true love with his grandson Ferdinand.
- Der letzte Ritter von Füssen (2019) is the Vol.41 of the children's detective fiction series Die Zeitdetektive by Fabian Lenk.
- The Eagle and the Songbird is a 2020 novel written by the music director Sara Schneider about the last years of Maximilian's reign, featuring the intertwining stories of the singer Catherine of Croy (the Songbird), the composer Ludwig Senfl and Maximilian (the Eagle).
- Der Kaiser - Maximilian I. (2022) is a graphic novel by the Italian artist Giulio Camagni. The story takes place in the era of Maximilian, the Last knight. The characters also include Lena, a girl from a Tyrolean family; Sepp, a servant who joined the mercenaries to escape poverty; Queen Bianca Maria Sforza; a young Albrecht Dürer, who was on his way to Italy; the humanist Willibald Pirckheimer; Duke Ludovico Sforza; tha banker Jakob Fugger; the reformer Martin Luther. Andreas Kanatschnig of the Kleine Zeitung praises the novel's realistic and demystifying approach towards the figure of the emperor.
- Loved by the Last Knight is a 2024 novel about Maximilian and Mary of Burgundy by Lily Harlem.

=== Music ===
- The anonymous Proch dolor in Brussels 228 is a motet of mourning for the death of Maximilian (1519). There are debates regarding whether the composer was Josquin des Prez or someone else.
- Hans Sachs (1494–1576), the meistersinger of Nuremberg, also called cobbler-poet, also often mentioned tales about Maximilian in his works. He was one of the source for the necromancer myth mentioned above.
- Albert Lortzing's opera Hans Sachs (1840), with libretto by the composer, Philipp Reger and Philipp Jakob Düringer is based on Deinhardstein's play mentioned above: Hans Sachs competes at a song competition judged by Maximilian and wins the hand of Kunigunde, whom he loves.
- Maximilian is a character in the 1849 five-act opera Ulrich von Hutten by Alexander Fesca, that featuring Hutten (who came to support Martin Luther, Maximilian, Franz von Sickingen in a 1523 setting.
- Hutten und Sickingen is an 1889 dramatisches Festspiel (dramatic festival play) by August Bungert, composed to celebrate the 400th year of the bird of Hutten. The characters include Hutten, Sickingen, Maximilian, Albrecht Dürer, Konrad Peutinger and his wife Constanze, Jakob Spiegel.
- Ignaz Brüll's opera Der Landfriede (1877) follows a comedy of the same name by Eduard von Bauernfeld (1869), which is about Maximilian and the world around him, set in Augsburg in 1518.
- Theuerdank is an 1897 opera by Ludwig Thuille with libretto by Alexander Ritter. The work talks about the love of Theuerdank for Editha. The work was unsuccessful.
- The 2019 album The last knight by the symphonic metal band Serenity is inspired by the life of Maximilian.

=== Paintings, illustrations and engravings ===
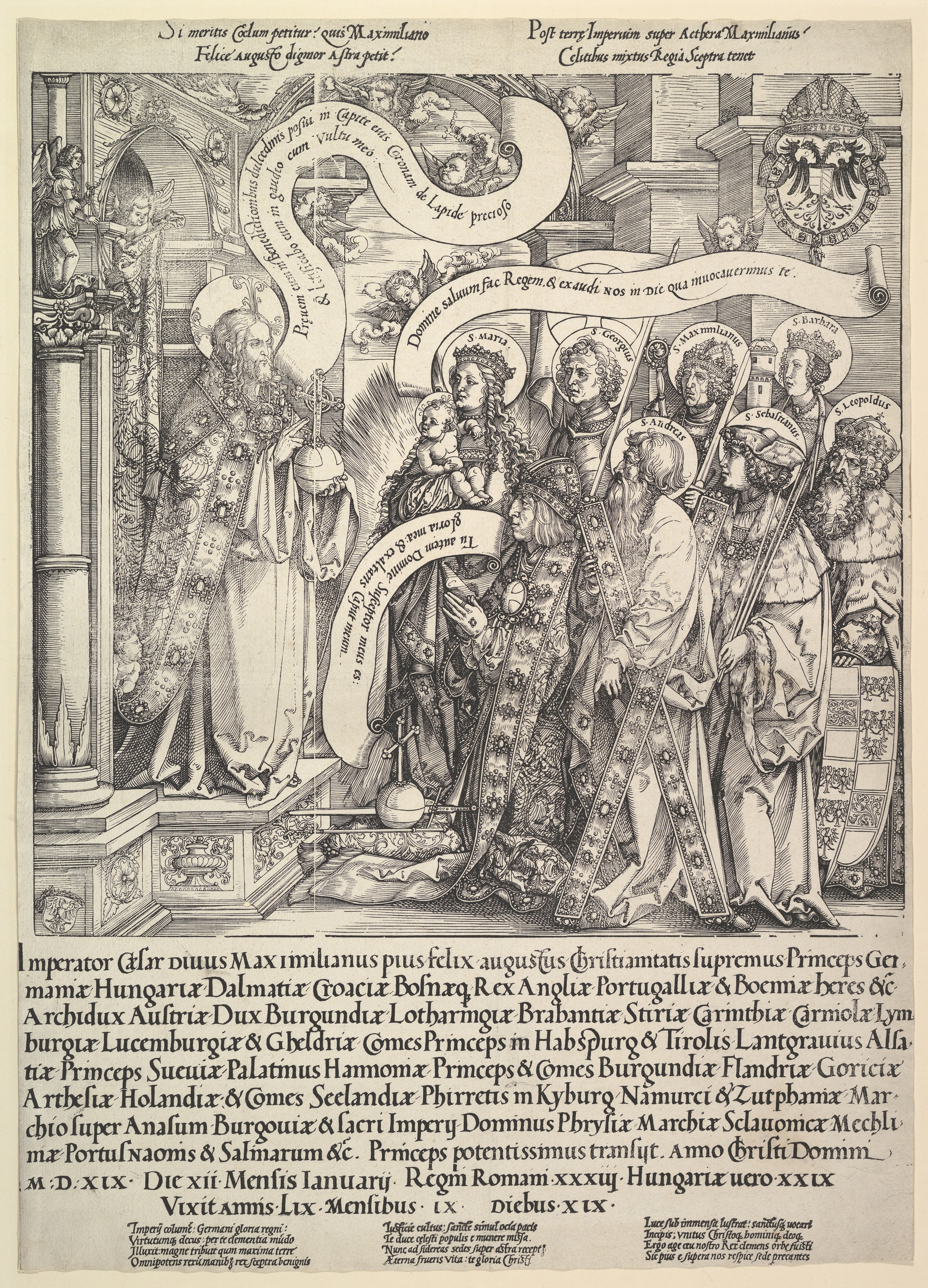
Maximilian Presented by his Patron Saints to the Almighty, 1519

- In 1519, after the emperor's death, Johannes Stabius ordered Hans Springinklee to create a woodcut that described the emperor, kneeling in full regalia before God the Father, presented by his patron saints already featured in his Prayerbook (the Virgin with the Child, St. George, St. Andrew, St. Sebastian, St. Maximilian, St. Barbara, and St. Leopold), now acting as his intercessors. Silver describes this as an imagined apotheosis. The emperor mirrored God as His vicar, saying, "Moreover, you O Lord are my supporter: You are my glory and you glorify my reign." Stabius's verses extolled Maximilian's reign: "Germani gloria regni". The emperor was to be "united with Christ, with man, with God", and in turn evoked as a saint.
- The copper plate portrait Emperor Maximilian I by Lucas van Leyden was the "earliest dated example of etching on copper." The softer copper allowed the artist to produce finer details. The artist utilized an innovative approach of combining etching with engraving, seen here for the first time in Northern Europe.

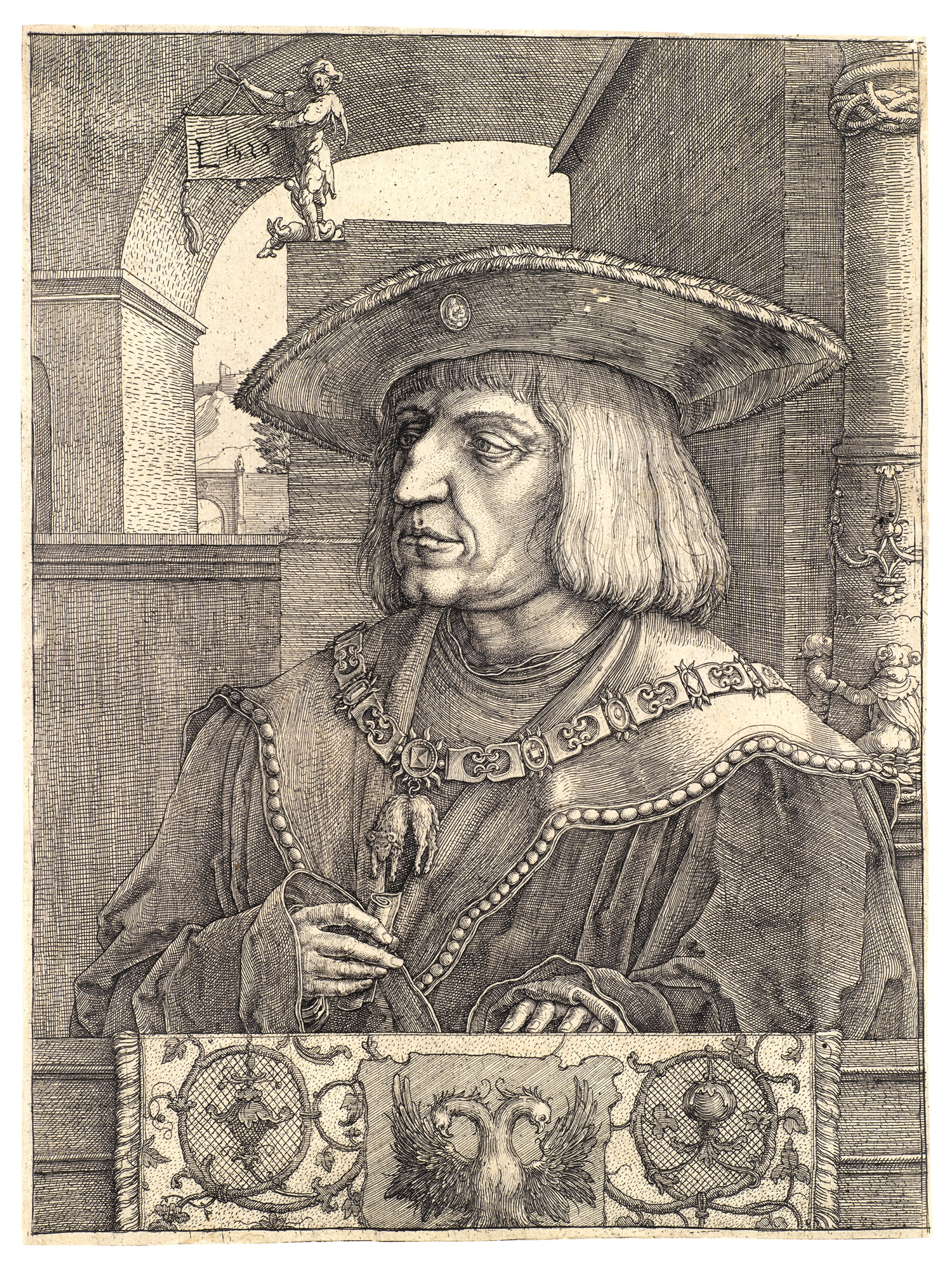
Emperor Maximilian I by Lucas Leiden, 1520

- Charles V's depictions of his lineage often focuses on his paternal ancestors, especially Maximilian and Mary as progenitors of his house. There is a pair of coloured drawings (on vellum), now kept at the British Museum, depicting Maximilian and Charles with their mottos, created by Jörg Breu the Younger (circa 1510 – 1547). The falcate wheel might represent life, Fortune, or perhaps the wheels used to punish prideful people seen in the Visions of Lazarus in the manuscript Livre de prières de Philippe le Bon, duc de Bourgogne, which belonged to Philip the Good. The globe on top is the globus cruciger, representing highest authority. Sagrario López Poza notes that this device of Maximilian, his most famous one, tended to go with the motto Per tot discrimina ("through so many moments of danger" – words from the Aeneid (I, 204), referencing the part Aeneas urged his companions to regain spirit after facing a storm in the seas of Sicily, caused by Juno's wrath. Halt Mass (keep the middle, be measured) was the motto Maximilian adopted as sovereign of the Order of the Golden Fleece. The pomegranate is the emperor's personal symbol, according to Johannes Stabius: "although a pomegranate's exterior is neither very beautiful nor endowed with a pleasant scent, it is sweet on the inside and is filled with a great many well-shaped seeds. Likewise the Emperor is endowed with many hidden qualities which became more and more apparent each day and continue to bear fruit."
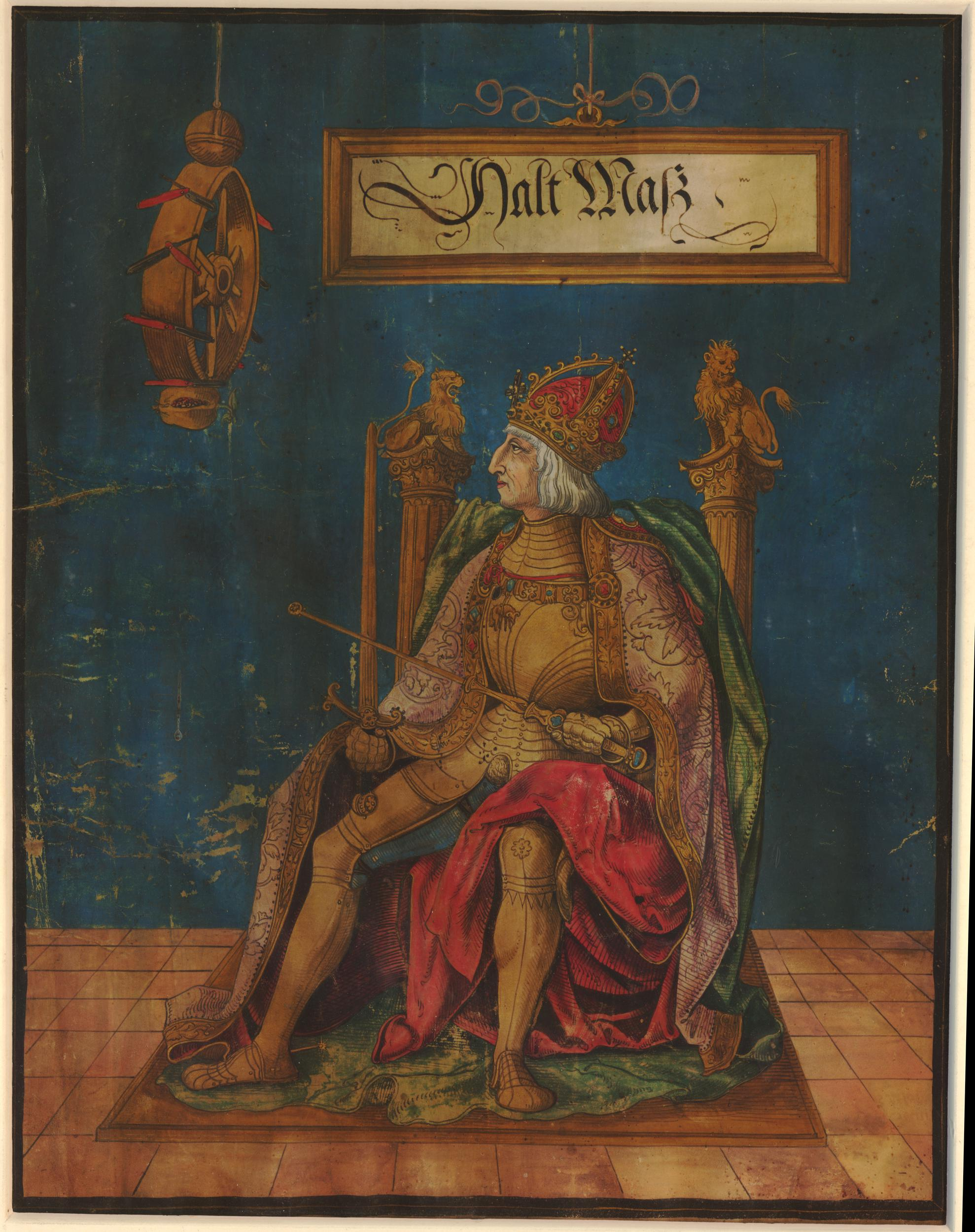
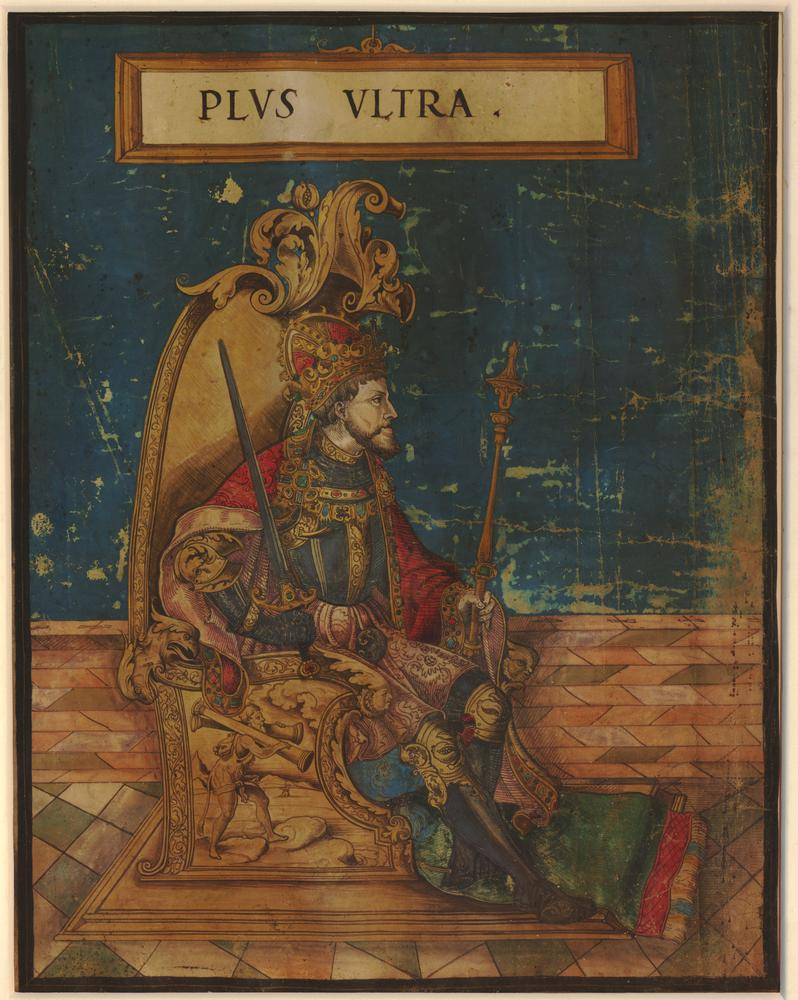
Coloured drawings on vellum by Jörg Breu the Younger, depicting Maximilian I and Charles V with their mottos ("HALT MASS" and "PLVS VLTRA"). The falcate wheel, wỉth the globus cruciger on top and the pomegranate at the bottom, is Maximilian's most famous device. Museum number:1876,0708.2634-2635.
- Around 1567–1571, Giorgio Vasari created the large-scale painting L'imperatore Massimiliano toglie l'assedio a Livorno (Maximilian lifting the siege of Livorno).
- The engraving made by Dominicus Custos in 1600 likely was the basis for Cornelis de Vos and Rubens's 1635 portrait later.
- Later Habsburgs continued with the triumphal iconography created by Maximilian and his artists. The Arch of Philip IV, "the widest and most splendid of them all", was created by Peter Paul Rubens, Jacob Jordaens and Cornelis de Vos (after 1614). The arch pays tribute to the founding moment of the marriage between Maximilian and Mary of Burgundy, a scene that had been depicted by Dürer in his Small Triumphal Chariot. See also Mary of Burgundy in arts and popular culture.
- In 1635, Cornelis de Vos painted Portrait of Maximilian I, Holy Roman Emperor, which was retouched by Rubens.
- The scene he bestowed his imperial crown on Amsterdam is depicted in several paintings and etchings, among them Keizer Maximiliaan I van Habsburg verleent de keizerskroon aan Amsterdam, Pieter Nolpe, after Nicolaes Moeyaert (1638), or the anonymous Keizer Maximiliaan verleent de stad Amsterdam het recht de keizerskroon in haar wapen te voeren.
- Among the 32 copperplate engravings depicting the history of Augsburg (the explanations for the engravings were created by historian Paul von Stetten, targeting female readers specifically) for the supraports of the Schaezlerpalais (these engravings were commissioned by the banker Benedikt Adam Liebert (1731–1780), based on drawings by Gottfried Eichler (1715–1770)), No.19 depicts the scene of the meeting between Maximilian and Konrad Peutinger's four-year-old daughter Juliana (born in 1500, she was the oldest of his eight children and known as a child prodigy), who greeted the emperor with a Latin speech. The emperor asked what she wanted for a reward, she replied, "A beautiful doll". She later died at age six; No.20 depicts the encounter between Maximilian and a Corpus Christi procession: When Maximilian was in Augsburg, he used to ride up the Singold River to hunt with falcons. Once he came to Göggingen during the week of Corpus Christi. When Maximilian found out that a procession was about to go from the village to a nearby chapel, he gave up the hunt and joined the pilgrimage with his court.
- Karl Ruß (1779 – 1843) painted Kaiser Maximilian besucht die Handwerker (1822), which shows the emperor visited a tanner's house. There was no specific event like this in recorded history, although Maximilian was known for general closeness to the common people.

A court valet brings little Maximilian poultry to the besieged city, illustration by Anton Ziegler

- Franz Krammer's 1831 work Kaiser Maximilian I. auf der Steinbockjagd depicts Maximilian on an ibex hunting trip.
- In 1845–1846, the author and artist Anton Ziegler (1793–1869) produced a series of illustrations for his work Vaterländische Bilder-Chronik aus der Geschichte des österreichischen Kaiserstaates. The parts dealing with Maximilian's life are illustrated with Ein Hofkammerdiener bringt dem kleinen Maximilian Geflügel in die belagerte Stadt (A court valet brings little Maximilian poultry to the besieged city) depicting Maximilian and his parents receiving poultry from their servants while being besieged by Frederick brother Albert and the Viennese; Todes: Urtheil gegen die Burgundischen Minister (Death:Judgment against Burgundian ministers) depicting Mary of Burgundy begging for her ministers; Maximilians Anrede an seine Deutschen und Niederländer (Maximilian's address to his Germans and Netherlanders); Maximilians ritterliche That zu Worms (Maxmilian's knightly deed in Worms) depicting Maximilian and Claude de Barre's duel; Zusammenkunft des Polen- und Ungarn Königs mit Maximilian zu Wien (Meeting of the Kings of Poland and Hungary with Maximilian in Vienna); Die Doppelheirath zu Wien (Double weddings in Vienna) depicting Maximilian and Anne of Bohemia and Hungary (Maximilian acted as proxy for his grandson Ferdinand in this occasion).

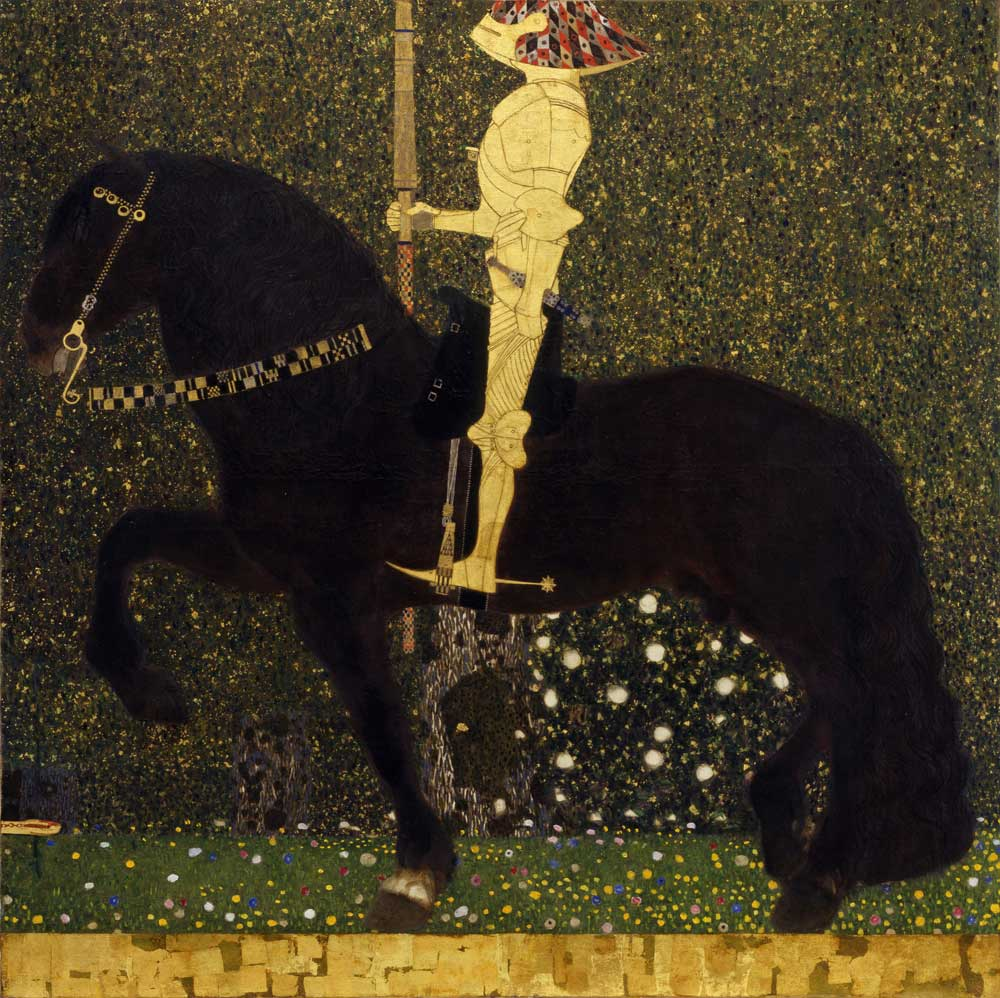
The Golden Knight by Gustav Klimt, 1903

- The double wedding that led to the establishment of the Danube Monarchy was immortalized by Václav Brožík by his 1898 Tu felix Austria nube, a monumental painting measuring fourteen by twenty four feet.
- Alfred Rethel painted the portrait of Maximilian I as part of a series that include Philip of Swabia, Maximilian I, Charles V and Maximilian II. These portraits are placed along those of other emperors who reigned from 768 to 1806 (created from 1839 to 1853) in the Kaisersaal in Frankfurt am Main. Historisches Museum Frankfurt keeps the rejected first version.
- Eduard Veith (1856 – 1925) painted Apotheose von Kaiser Maximilian I (Apotheosis of Emperor Maximilian I).
- In 1861, David Levy Elkan produced the Einzug des Kaisers Maximilian I. in Köln 1505, depicting Maximilian's entry in Köln, aquarelle.
- Karl von Blaas's 1868 Kaiser Maximilian und Georg von Frundsberg shows the influence of Rethel's work.
- Jan Matejko painted the scene of the meeting between Maximilian and Vladislaus II and Sigismund I before the Congress of Vienna (1515) in 1879 or 1880. The painter offered this painting as a gift to Emperor Franz Joseph, who liked it very much.
- Klimt's 1903 The Golden Knight referred to prints by Burgkmair and Dürer as well as two late Gothic armours of the emperor, showing the figure of his as a chivalric ideal.
- In 2019, Herbert Lippert dedicated a cycle of oil-on-canvas paintings to Maximilian, who was a pioneer in developing arts, especially music.

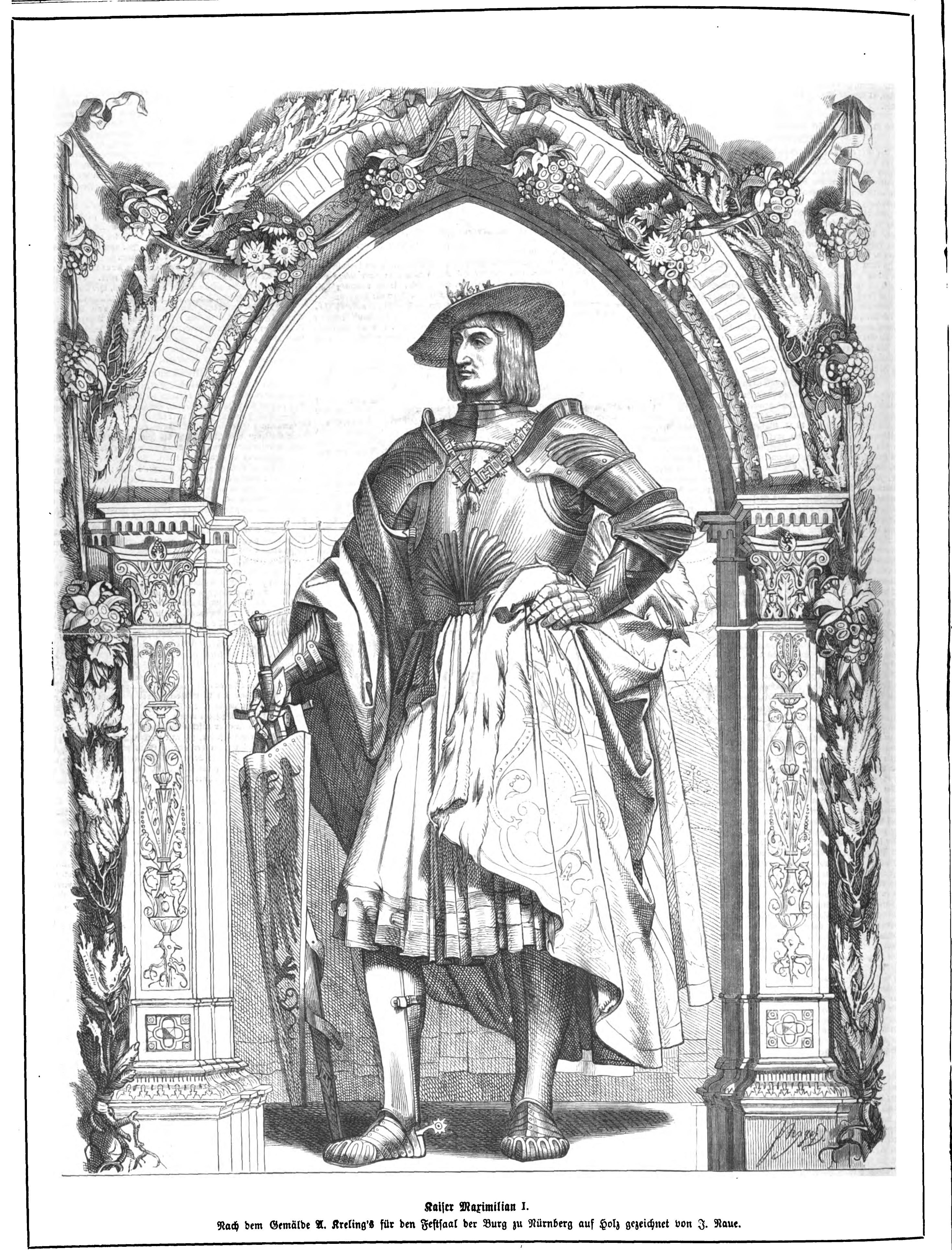
Maximilian's portrait. Woodcut by J.Naue, after original painting by A.Kreling for the ballroom of Nuremberg Castle.

Maximilian's relationship with notable artists and scholars of his time was a popular topic in the nineteenth century, with artworks including:

- Julius Victor Berger (1850—1902) celebrated Habsburg art patronage with a ceiling painting in the Gold Saal, Kunsthistorisches Museum. Characters include Maximilian, Dürer, Archduke Ferdinand II, Cellini, Archduke Leopold Wilhelm etc.
- Wilhelm (Guillaume) Koller painted the 1870 Albrecht Dürer wird von Kaiser Maximilian bei der Arbeit besucht (Albrecht Dürer is visited by Emperor Maximilian while at work) (other than the 1871 Kaiser Maximilian I. hält Dürer die Leiter, mentioned in the Legends and Anecdotes section above).
- Between 1851 and 1900, Friedrich Martersteig painted the Ulrich von Huttens Dichterkrönung 1517 in Augsburg durch Kaiser Maximilian I., depicting Ulrich von Hutten being crowned as Poet Laureate by Maximilian in 1517.
- Karl Becker produced a painting of the same topic in 1876.
- Karl Jäger (1833–1887) painted the scene of Maximilian sitting for a portrait by Albrecht Dürer in his work Maximilian I. bei Albrecht Dürer (between 1882 and 1886).

The Burgundian episode and the marriage with Mary of Burgundy have a cultural afterlife. Some of the works depicting this episode are:

- There is an oil painting (end of the sixteenth century), now at the Schatzkammer Ritterlicher Kreuzherrenorden mit dem Roten Stern (Vienna), depicting Maximilian and Mary of Burgundy standing with the Virgin and the Child between them.

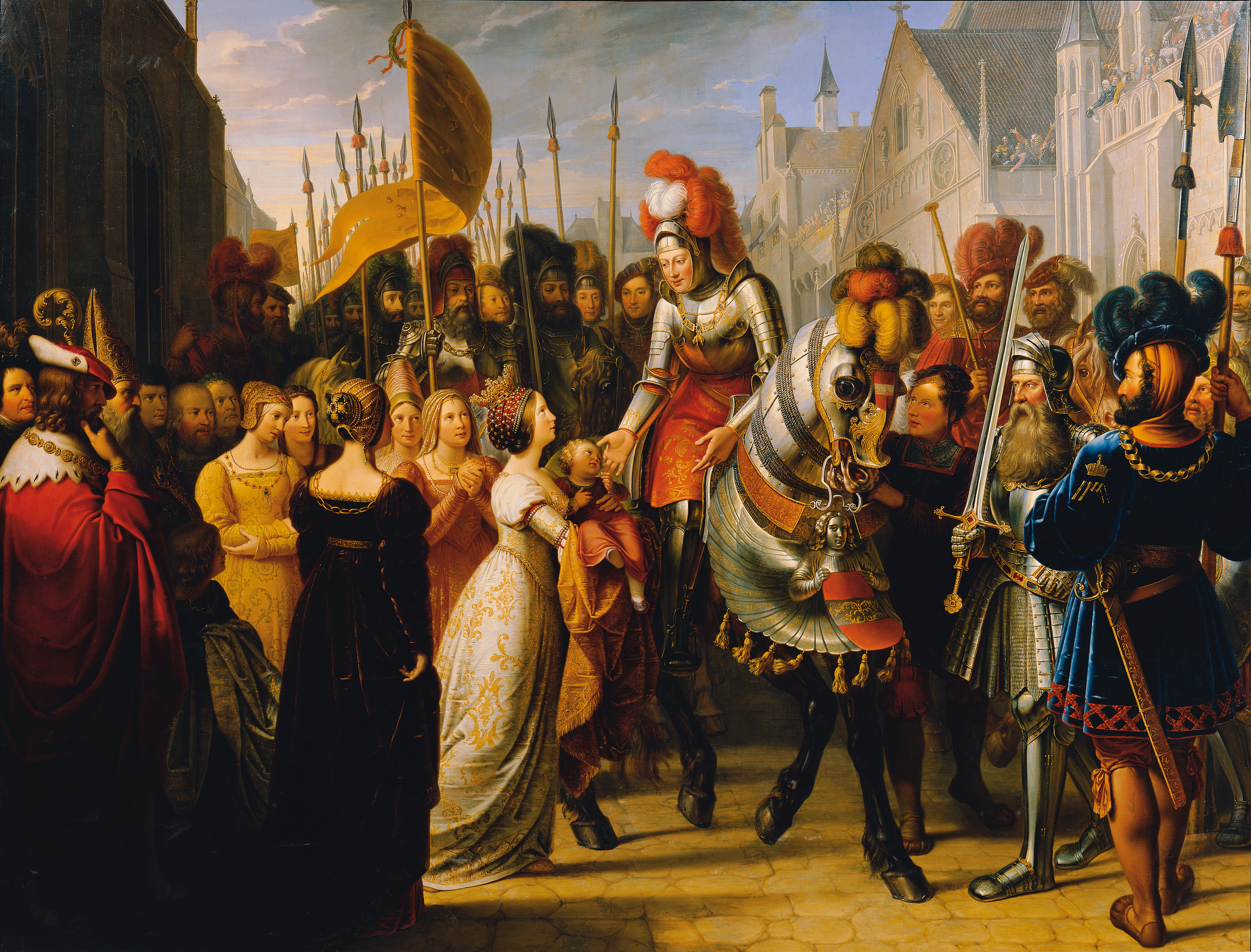
Der Einzug Kaiser Maximilians I. in Gent by Anton Petter (Kunsthistorisches Museum)

- There is a ceiling painting in the Kaisersaal in Fulda, painted by German artist Emanuel Wohlhaupter between 1728 and 1730, depicting Maximilian and Mary of Burgundy being crowned with the Austrian ducal hat. (Kaiser Maximilian I. und seine Gemahlin Maria von Burgund werden mit dem österreichischen Herzogshut gekrönt)

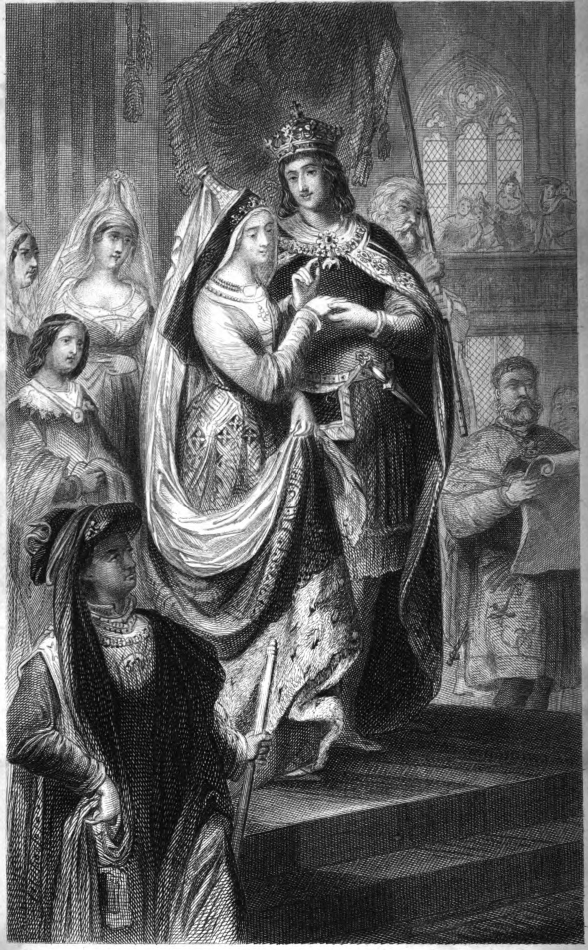
Maximilian I. und Maria von Burgund by August Weger in Leipzig

- There are two paintings involving Mary and Maximilian among the principal historical paintings of the painter Anton Petter (1791 – 1858): one is Der Einzug Kaiser Maximilians I.in Gent (1822, Belvedere, Wien) in which Mary presented their son to her husband and the other is Kaiser Maximilian I und Maria von Burgund which describes their meeting (1813, Joanneum at Graz). Anton Petter also painted the scene of Kunz von der Rosen trying to free Maximilian in Bruges (Kunz von der Rosen sucht den Kaiser Maximilian I. aus der Gefangenschaft zu befreyen).
- In 1845, Jules (Julius) Storms, painter from Brussels, painted "Les dernier moments de Marie de Bourgogne", showing the dying duchess surrounded by her young husband, their two children and her lords.
- Austrian artist Gustav Gaul (1836–1888) painted The first meeting of Maximilian I and Mary of Burgundy on 18 August 1477, Ghent. In 1879, Hans Makart reproduced the scene in photographical form. Archduke Karl Stephan played the role of his ancestor Maximilian, while Princess Gisela of Bavaria dressed as Mary of Burgundy, Archduchess of York as Margaret of York, Archduchess Maria Theresia as the Countess of Winchester, Archduchess Christina as Katharina von Kallrayl, Archduke Joseph as Margrave Karl von Baden, Prince Leopold of Bayern as Landgrave Heinrich von Hessen and Archduke Ferdinand Karl as a page.
- German painter Wilhelm Camphausen (1818 –1885) created the engravings Erzherzog Maximilian, der spätere Heilige Römische Kaiser Maximilian I., mit seiner Braut, Maria von Burgund, in Gent, depicting the 1477 entry of Maximilian and Mary into Ghent, and Kaiser Max besiegt den französischen Ritter Claudius de Barre, depicting the duel between Maximilian and the knight Claude de Barre (a real life event that happened in 1495: Claude de Barre or Claude de Vaudrey was the Chamberlain of Burgundy, who challenged Maximilian in Worms.).
- August Weger (1823 – 1892) created the art print Maximilian I. und Maria von Burgund.
- In 1880, Alois Greil painted the Einzug Kaisers Maximilian I. in Gent (Entry of Maximilian into Ghent), aquarelle (Illustration in Crown Prince Ruldolph's album, based on this painting).
- In 1881, Wilhelm Koller painted the Brautzug Maximilian I. und der Maria von Burgund (1477), aquarelle (Illustration in Crown Prince Ruldolph's album, based on this painting).
- Austrian artist Alois Hans Schram painted the scene of Maximilian returning to Mary and Philip in Ghent after the Battle of Guinegate (1479) (Rückkehr Maximilians I. nach der Schlacht von Guinegate (1479), reproduced as photogravure in the German newspaper Die Gartenlaube, 1890, no. 25).

Between 1915 and 1918, artists were commissioned to decorate the Festsaal of the Neuen Burg in Vienna. Alois Hans Schramm created, in Baroque style (at that time no longer common, probably used to remind the viewers of the most prosperous era of Habsburg power), the ceiling painting, that shows Magna Mater Austriae surrounded by Olympian gods and members of the House of Habsburg, beginning with Maximilian and Mary. Charles V, Don Juan of Austria, Georg von Frundsberg(?) and Nuremberg citizens (?) also appeared.

Artists in the Würtemberg region tend to be interested in the relationship between Maximilian and Eberhart im Bart, the first duke of Würtemberg.

- In 1845, Josef Anton Gegenbauer created a series of frescos about the life of Eberhart im Bart, including Graf Eberhard im Bart wird von Kaiser Maximilian mit der Herzogswürde belehnt, 1495 and Kaiser Maximilian I. am Grab Herzogs Eberhard im Bart auf dem Einsiedel im Schönbuch 1499 for the Neue Schloß in Stuttgart.
- In 1858, Carl Heideloff created the painting Kaiser Maximilian am Grabe Herzogs Eberhard im Bart, depicting Maximilian at Eberhard's grave.

=== Sculptures ===
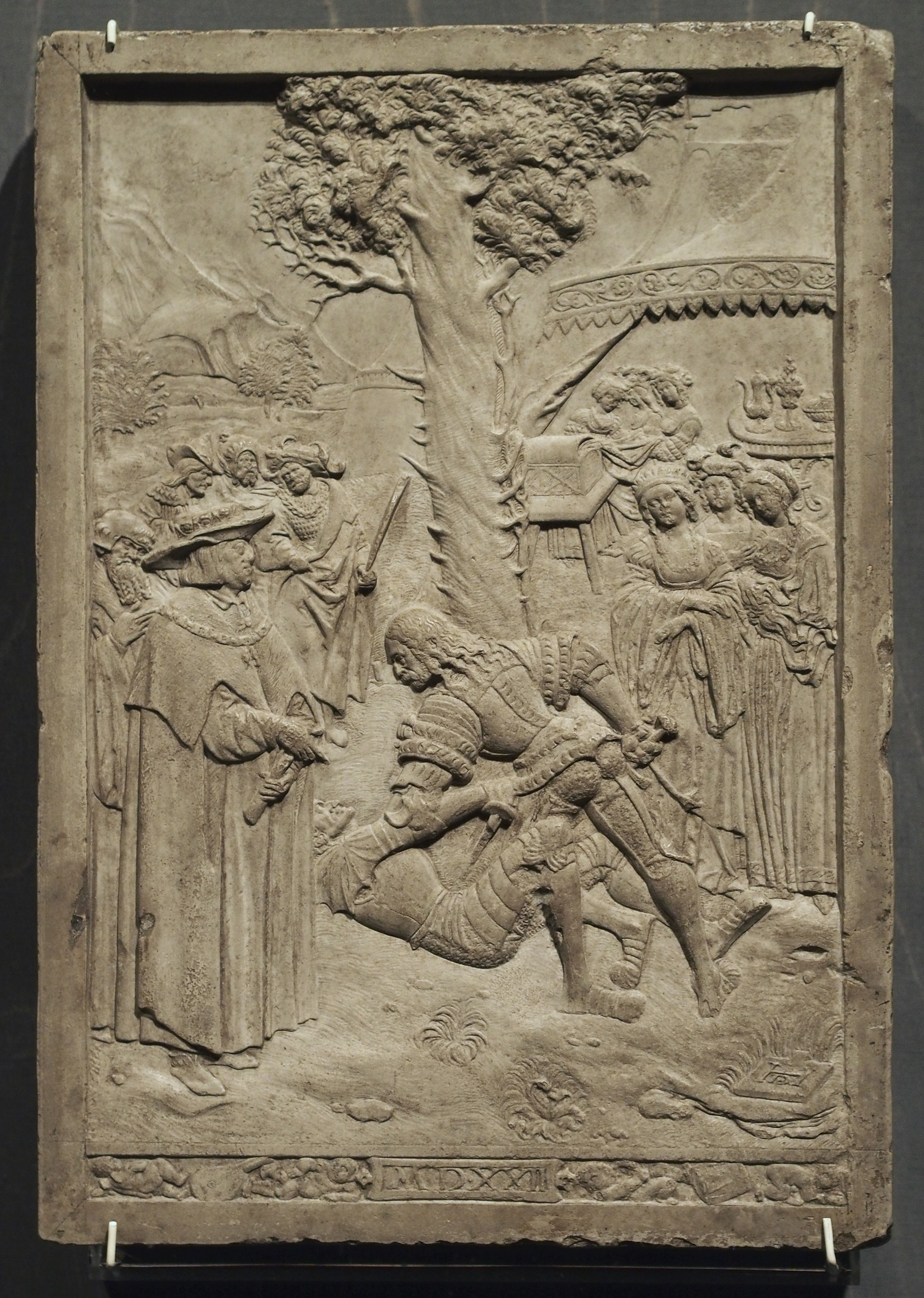
Allegorical Duel between Albrecht Dürer and Apelles by Hans Daucher, 1522

- In 1521, in the face of a menacing Ottoman advance (Siege of Belgrade), Hans Daucher produced the limestone relief Maximilian I on Horseback in the Guise of Saint George, showing the emperor's horse crushing a deagon.
- In 1522, Daucher produced the relief Allegorical Duel between Albrecht Dürer and Apelles, showing Maximilian as a judge in the fight between Albrecht Dürer and the poet Apelles. Thomas Eser considers this an allegory for both Maximilian's and Dürer's roles in advancing German arts. There are some debates around the identity of Dürer's opponent.
- Also in 1522, Daucher created the relief Allegory of Virtues and Vices at the Court of Charles V showing Maximilian symbolically at Charles V's side.
- The Merchants' House (Kaufhaus) in Freiburg has a statue of the emperor, who had been the important patron of the city and its university, standing outside together with Philip the Fair, Charles V and Ferdinand I (the house and the sculptures, created by Sixt von Staufen, were built between 1520 and 1532; Philip had visited the city together with his father and step-mother during the Reichstag of 1498).
- In 1870, Joseph Gasser von Valhorn built a statue of Maximilian for the Feldherrnhalle (Maximilia is first from the left) or Generals' Hall in the Waffenmuseum des Arsenals. It is still there, now Museum of Military History, Vienna
- Sculptor Carl Seffner built a 2.2 metre tall bronze statue for Maximilian in Leipzig in 1897. It commemorated the day he granted the Fairs Charter to Leipzig, making the city one of the most important trade fair cities in Europe.

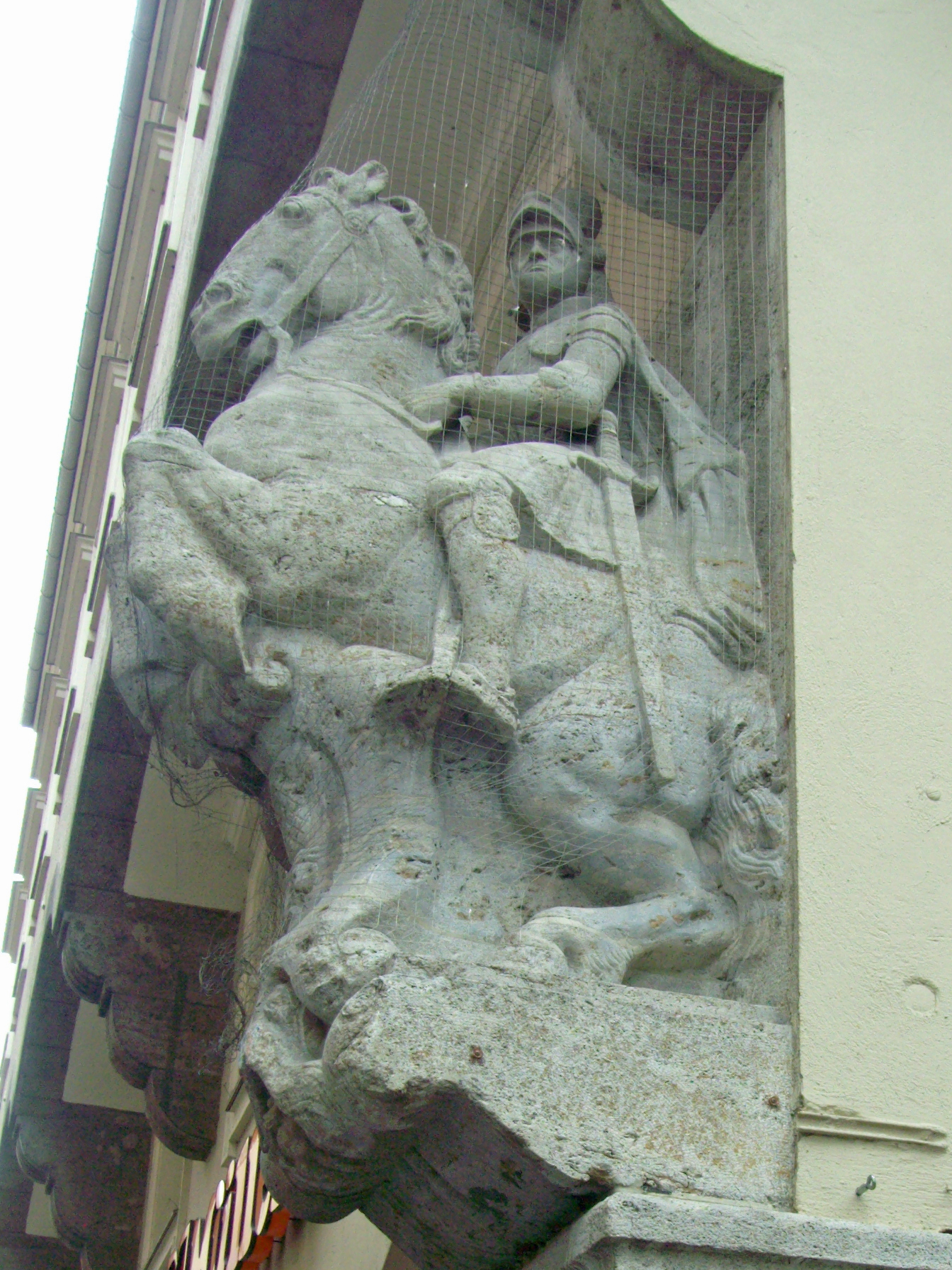
Maximilian's equestrian statue in Augsburg, built in 1913

- In 1902, Cormons hired Viennese artist E. Hofmann to create a statue for the emperor, which has become an icon for the city. Since 1981, it has been put up again in Piazza Libertà after being removed due to World War I. In 2016, there were debates over the ownership of the statue. In the end, the province of Gorizia decided to transfer ownership to the Municipality of Cormons.
- Around 1910, the Municipal Savings Bank in Freiburg had a marble relief portrait of Maximilian made and installed inside the Whale House, built by Maximilian's treasurer Jakob Villinger von Schönenberg (the emperor stayed there when he visited Freiburg). The portrait can now be seen at the Kartoffelmarkt (Old Potato Market Square) and was made by the Freiburg sculptor Waldemar Fenn.

In his lifetime, the emperor planned to build an equestrian statue of himself (based on a 1509 design by Hans Burgkmair, which itself was a revised edition of the 1508 woodcut mentioned above), which would be housed in the Church of Saints Ulrich and Afra in Augsburg. But the death in 1510 of the local abbot Conrad Mörlin, who had supported the monument, halted the project, which would never be completed.

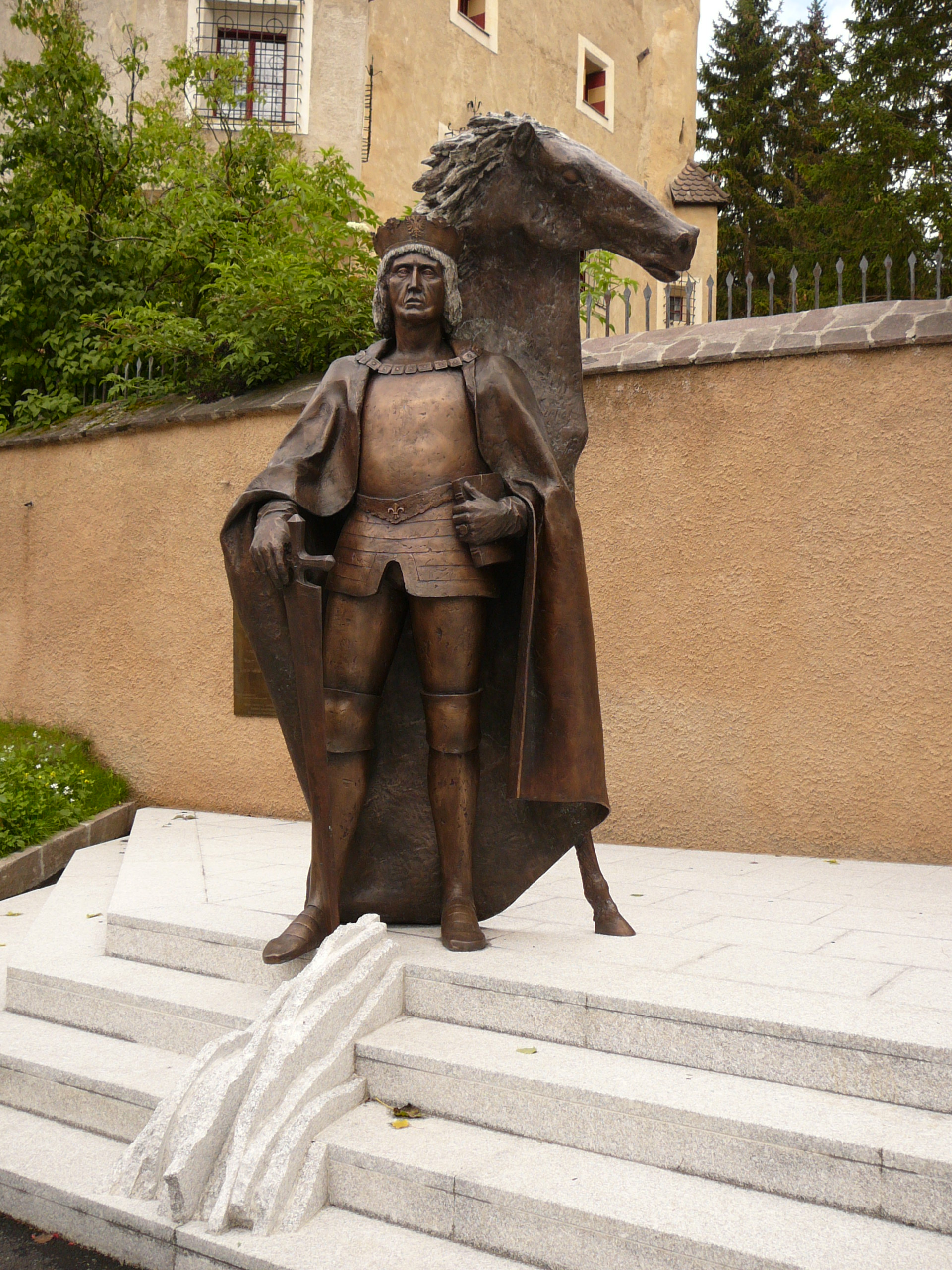
Maximilian's statue in Toblach

- In 1913, Augsburg hired the sculptor Georg Albertshofer from Munich to make an equestrian statue of Maximilian. Next to the monument is the farewell said by the emperor in 1518 (when he knew his end was near and he would never see Augsburg again), carved in Fraktur: "Nun gesegne Dich Gott Du liebes Augsburg und alle frommen Bürger darinnen! Wohl haben wir manchen frohen Mut in Dir gehabt. Nun werden wir Dich nicht mehr sehen." ("May God bless you, dear Augsburg, and all the pious citizens within! We have indeed had many happy moments with thee. Now we won't see thee anymore.")
- In 1892, in 1892, Konstanz's sculptor Hans Baur (1829–1897), won the competition to build a fountain to replace the then dilapidated fountain in the Marktstätte. Baur built a red sandstone four-sided stele or obelisk at the centre of a granite basin of the fountain, now called Kaiserbrunnen (Imperial Fountain). Four great German emperors, representing four great ruling dynasties were chosen: Heinrich III (Franks), Friedrich Barbarossa (Hohenstaufen), Maximilian I (Habsburg) und Wilhelm I (Hohenzollern). The choices and manners of depicting the emperors were considered traditional. When the new fountain was unveiled on 30 October 1897, Bauer had died six months before. Later, the portraits were melted down during wartime.

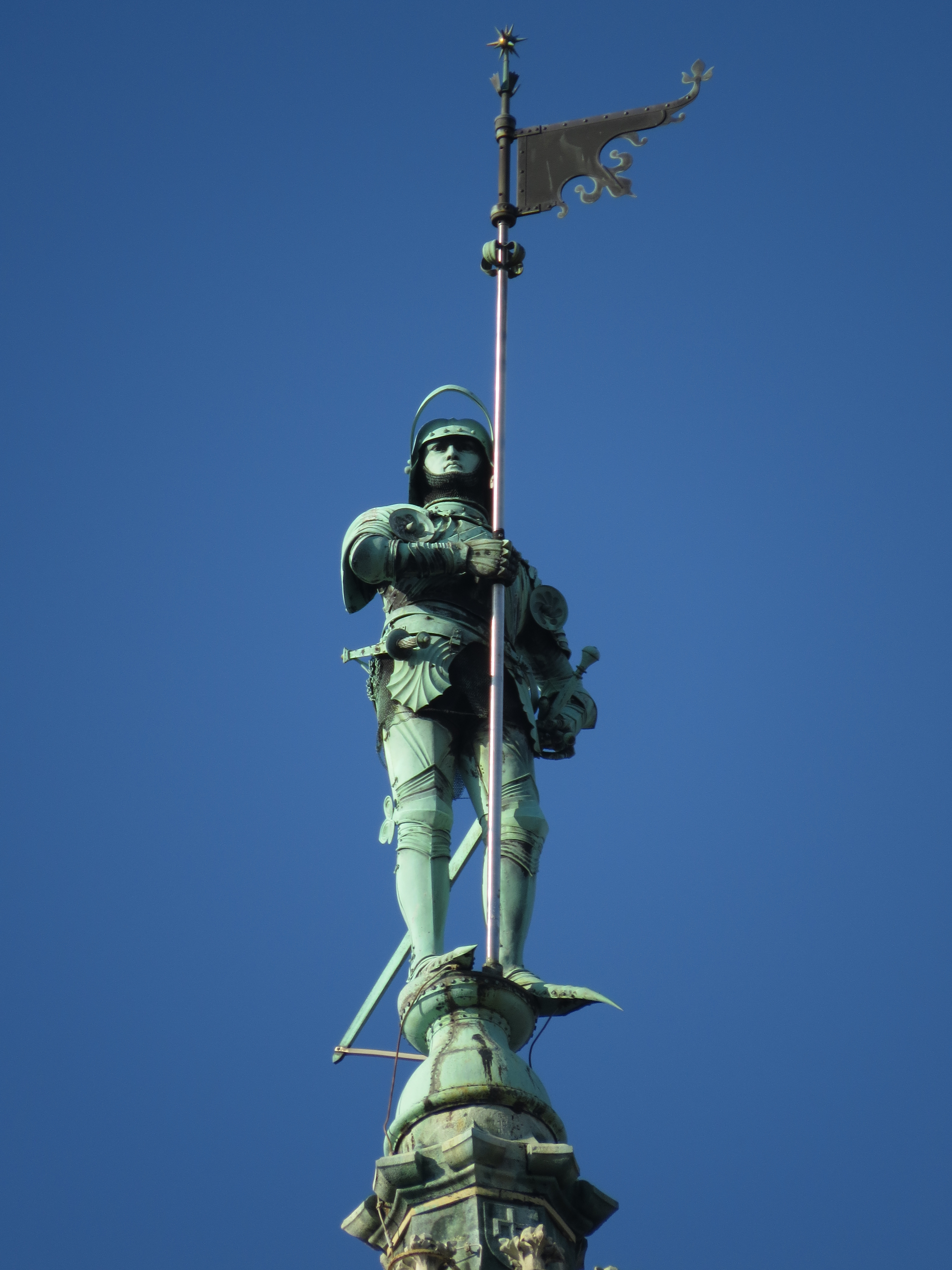
The Rathausmann, a symbol of Vienna

In 1993, new imperial portraits were made by Gernot and Barbara Rumpf. Maximilian, together with Bianca Maria, and Frederick Barbarossa returned, depicted in a caricatural manner, while Otto I was introduced (depicted seriously). Maximilian is shown extending his hand like a beggar, while a bird on the bonnet of the empress sometimes spits water into his hand, seemingly symbolizing their loveless and money-based marriage and alluding to his neverending financial troubles. Emperor Wilhelm I was replaced with a pigeon, perhaps symbolizing peace.

- In 1971, in Kitzbühel, Josef Dangl created three busts of Maximilian, Margarete Maultasch and Ludwig II of Bavaria for the Municipal Fountain.
- In 2009, Toblach (Dobbiaco) in South Tyrol dedicated a statue to Maximilian, near the Castle of Herbstenburg, which was his headquarters around 1508–1511.
- In 2018, Klagenfurt dedicated a bust, made by the artist Bella Ban, to the emperor.
- In 2019, in commemoration of his death, the Republic of Austria commissioned the artist Rudi Wach to cast a bronze statue of the emperor.
- The Rathausmann is a huge iron monument of a soldier, depicted in a suit of armour modeled after that of Maximilian.

=== Tapestries ===
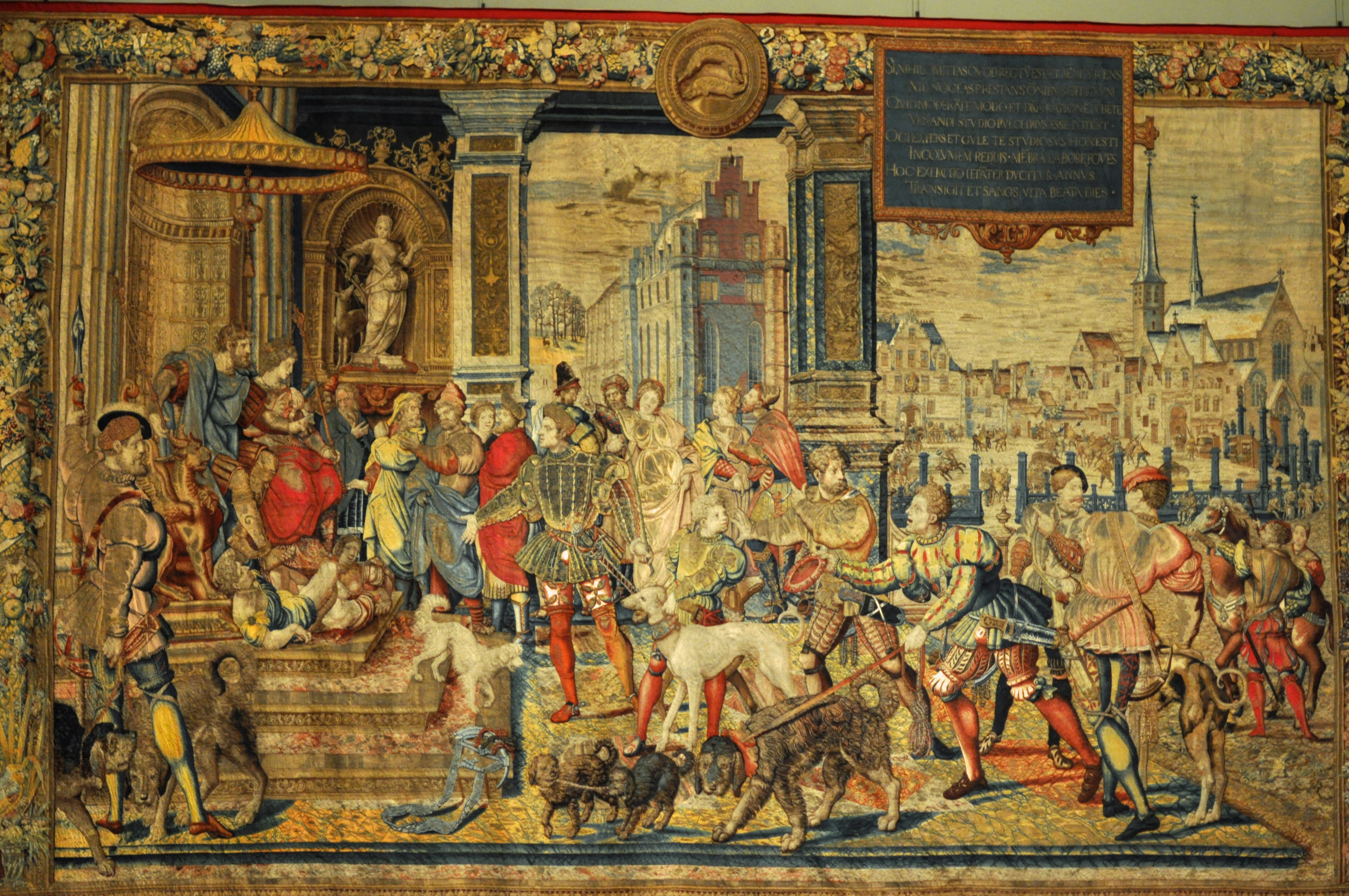
Hunt of Maximilian, February, Louvre. The Hunts of Maximilian set, together with Los Honores, is considered one of the most important and mysterious set in the history of the Netherlands Renaissance tapestry history. It is also the most famous set designed by Bernaert van Orley. The Cour des Bailles can be seen here.

- The Hunts of Maximilian or Les Chasses de Maximilien, also Les Belles chasses de Guise (The Beautiful Hunts of Guise) are a set of twelve tapestries, one per month, depicting hunting scenes in the Sonian Forest, south of Brussels, by the court of Maximilian. They were designed by Bernaert van Orley and woven in the Dermoyen workshop around 1531–33.
- The tapestry set Los Honores (commissioned by Charles V in 1520, but possibly first conceptualized by Maximilian and Margaret of Austria), designed by Bernaert van Orley and other unidentified artists, woven by Pieter van Aelst's workshop in Brussels, features Maximilian as Octavian and Margaret as Esther.
- The Nassau Genealogy (ca. 1529–31, now destroyed but designs survive), commissioned by the Nassau family "pairs male and female equestrian figures as in the Jacob Cornelisz van Oostsanen woodcut cavalcade of the counts of Holland, a recent suite (1518) that culminated with Maximilian, Mary of Burgundy, Philip the Fair, and Charles V".

=== Architecture ===
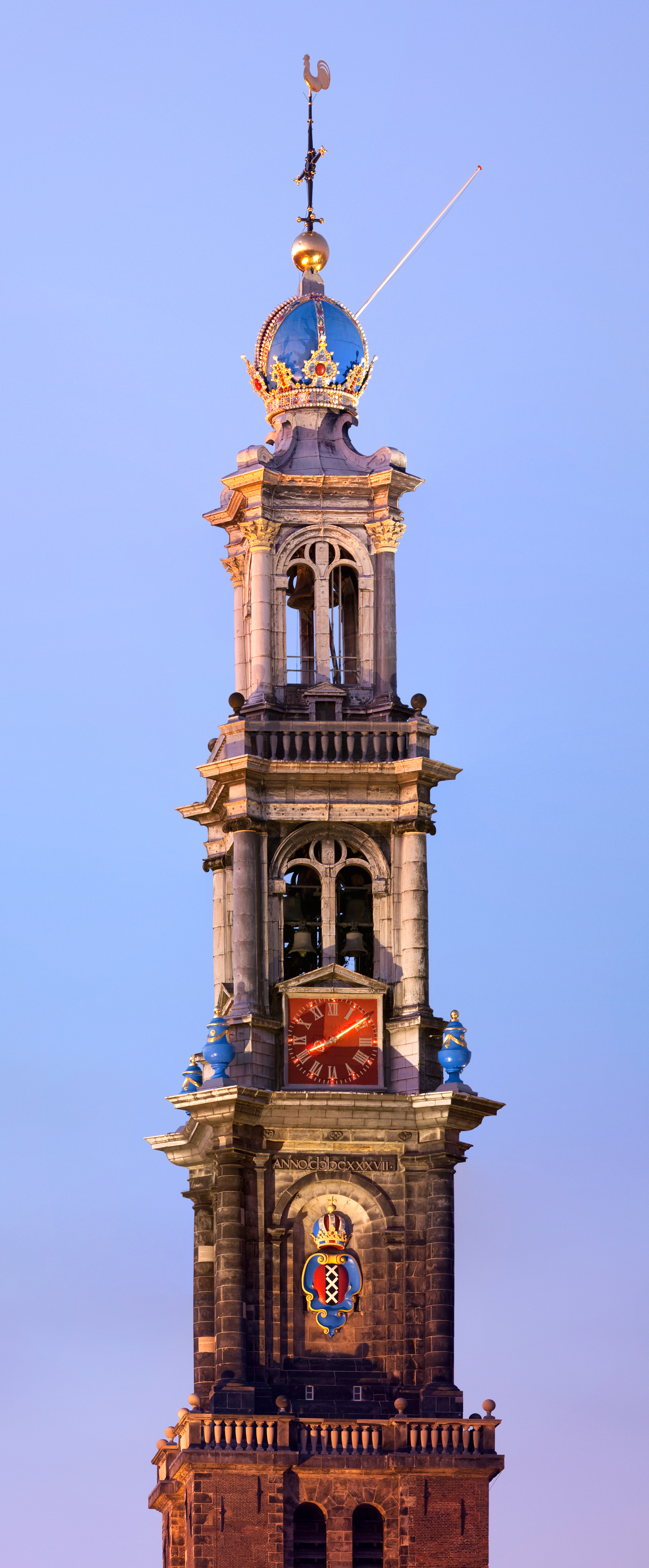
The Westertoren, the church tower of the Westerkerk and the highest church tower in Amsterdam

- The castle Burg Kreuzenstein was rebuilt in the nineteenth century as a fictive residence for Maximilian by his great admirer, the Arctic explorer Count Johann Nepomuk Wilczek. Maximilian's coat of arms hangs above the gate. A showpiece is the lathe used by Maximilian in real life (bought by the count in an auction) – this is the earliest extant lathe known in the world.
- The crown on top of the spire of the Westerkerk in Amsterdam is the Imperial Crown of Maximilian. As the city supported him financially during his time in the Low Countries, in 1489, he granted them the right to use his crown, which has also adorned the Coat of arms of Amsterdam until this day. In the old times, ships carrying this symbol implied imperial protection as well as prestige, bringing the mercantile Amsterdammers benefit. The definite design was commissioned by Rudolph II in 1602 and executed by Hendrick de Keyser (the tower was built in 1638 according to a different design, but Keyser's design for the crown was kept), so it became a Rudolphine crown. In the 19th century, the colour was changed into golden yellow to match the imperial crown's colour in Vienna. During the 2006 renovation, the original blue scheme was restored. Even though the Netherlands left the Empire after the 1648 Peace of Münster, the city chose to keep the crown on the top of the tower as well as in its coat of arms and other derivative designs, perhaps because it wanted to signal that the city was about more than the stadtholder (who did not even wear a royal crown), or that as the leading commercial city of Europe, it wanted to claim the status of the successor of Rome. Joost van den Vondel wrote the following poem:

Aen d'Aemstel, en aen't Y, daer doet sich heerlijck ope
Sy die, als Keyserin, de kroon draeght van Europe.

Alongside the Amstel, and alongside the Y is wonderfully exposed,
She who, like an Empress, wears the crown of Europe.

- The Abbey Tower, nicknamed Lange Jan, in Middelburg, also wears the crown of Maximilian. This crown, the Habsburg double-eagle and other symbols from Maximilian's era leave their mark in other cities like Nijmegen, Tiel or Den Haag etc. as well, often as part of their coats-of-arms.
- The building no.572 on the Keizersgracht is a Rijksmonument. It was formed in 1770 when the owner Jan Joost Marcus combined two houses into one to welcome his bride Maria Anthonia Jonk. In the First World War, the building was used as the Belgian Consulate. The building has been expanded, modified and renovated for a few times during the 20th and 21st centuries and is now named Max after both the emperor and the canal.
- The Maximiliaanzaal (Salle de Maximilien), or Maximilian Chamber, is a luxurious hall inside the Stadhuis van Brussel, today used by the City Council. The name comes from the double painting (near the fireplace) of Mary and Maximilian (1881) by Jean-Pierre Cluysenaar.
- The Landesfürstliches Amtshaus (Princely office building) or Maximilianisches Amtshaus in Bolzano (Bozen) was renovated by Maximilian between 1486 and 1510, from that time on the building's shape has been preserved until modern day. The emperor stayed there during his eight visits to Bolzano. Since 1999, it has become the Naturmuseum Südtirol (South Tyrol Museum of Nature). In 2019, the special exhibition Das Amtshaus des Kaisers ("The Kaiser's Office") was organized in commemoration of the 500th year of Maximilian's death.
- The mascot of the city of Hamm, the elephant Maxi, is tied to the emperor. The most known representation is the landmark building Glaselefant ("Glass elephant") .
- A new district in Wiener-Neustadt, the emperor's birthplace, will be named Maximilium am Stadtpark and built by Hallmann and SÜBA. The five winners of the naming contest got 17,500 Euros for their idea.

=== Films ===
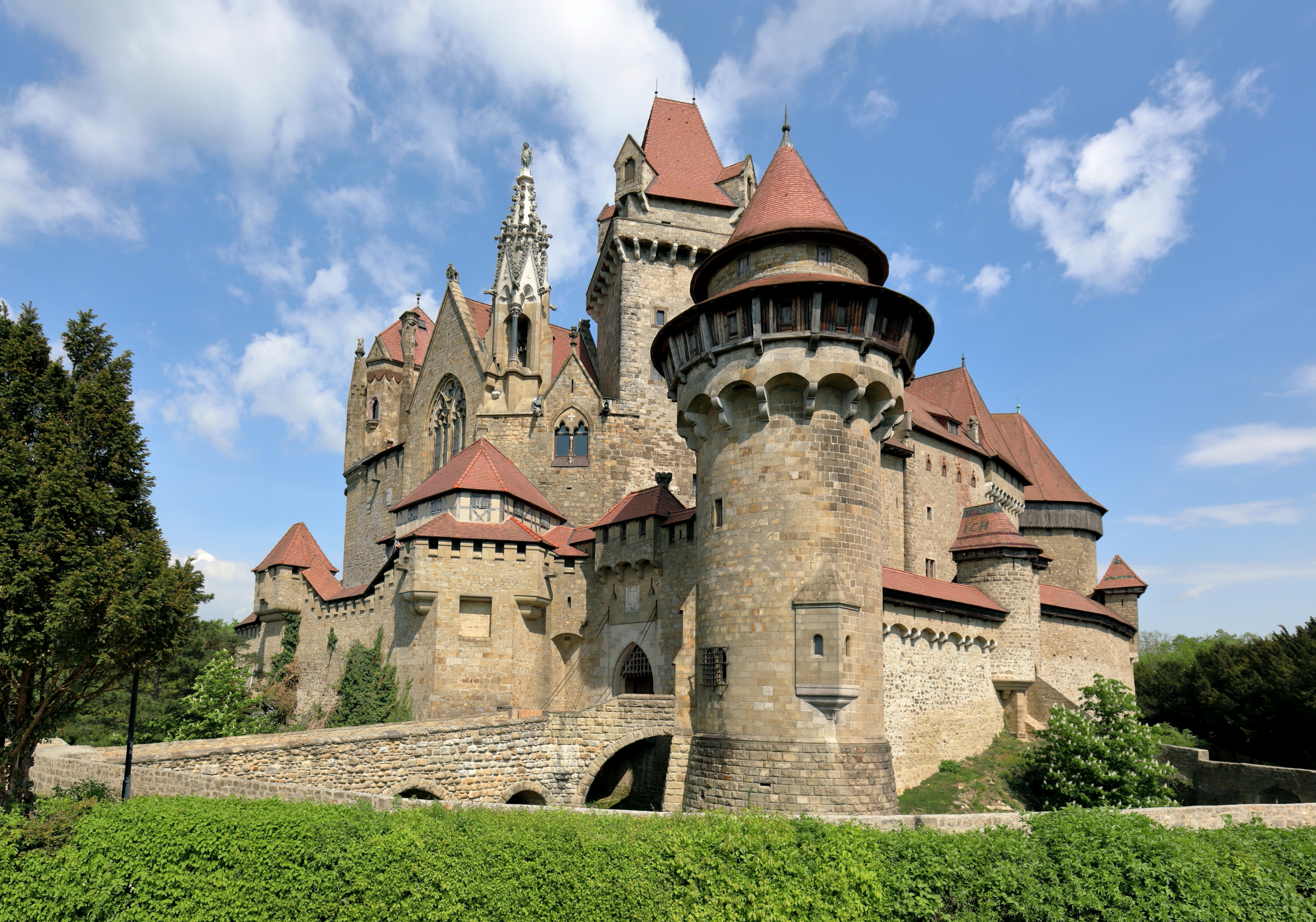
The 2017 Maximilian – Das Spiel von Macht und Liebe was partly filmed at Burg Kreuzenstein. The Austrian ORF broadcast the film immediately after filming, in December 2016, but ZDF waited ten months so that it could be broadcast on 3 October of the next year, the German Unity Day.

- He is played by Ralph Graves in the 1924 Yolanda (Yolanda here is another name for Mary of Burgundy), a silent film directed by Robert G. Vignola and produced by William Randolph Hearst.
- Maximilian is portrayed by Leopold von Ledebur in the 1925 silent film Goetz von Berlichingen of the Iron Hand (Götz von Berlichingen zubenannt mit der eisernen Hand).
- He appeared in the 1939 drama film The Immortal Heart (Das Unsterbliche Herz), portrayed by Fred Köster.
- He is portrayed by Marcel Charvey in the 1965 French film Goetz von Berlichingen directed by Jean-Paul Carrère.
- He is portrayed by Erik Frey in the 1979 German-Yugoslavian film Goetz von Berlichingen of the Iron Hand (Götz von Berlichingen mit der eisernen Hand).
- Maximilian and the Viennese double wedding are portrayed in the 1952 Austrian movie 1. April 2000 directed by Wolfgang Liebeneiner. As the film was a hint to the Allies regarding the matter of returning country status and independence to Austria, the best aspects of Austrian history and culture are emphasized. The double wedding scene, a notable aspect of the Habsburg Myth (Habsburgermythos), is a representation of the value of diplomacy, rather than warfare.
- The relationship between Maximilian (Klausjürgen Wussow) and the Fuggers is portrayed in Episodes 3 and 4 of the 1983 series Vom Webstuhl zur Weltmacht (based on Günter Ogger's book Kauf dir einen Kaiser. Die Geschichte der Fugger)
- Die letzten ihrer Art, the last episode of ZDF's 2014 documentary series Die Welt der Ritter is about the parallel stories of Maximilian and Götz von Berlichingen. Maximilian is known as the last knight but in reality more of a leisure knight or a reenactor rather than a classic one. Regarding his role as the chief military and political reforming force of the time, Die Welt comments that he should be called the Gravedigger [of the knights]. Berlichingen, on the other hand, was one of the last true knights, who suddenly became considered as robbers in Maximilian's reformed world.
- He is portrayed by José Coronado in the 2016 Spanish La corona partida.
- Maximilian – Der letzte Ritter is a 2017 ZDF documentary about Maximilian's life. He is portrayed by Johannes Silberschneider.
- Maximilian – Das Spiel von Macht und Liebe ("Maximilian: The Game of Power and Love"), released in the United States as Maximilian and Marie De Bourgogne or simply Maximilian, is a 2017 German-Austrian three-part historical miniseries, starring Jannis Niewöhner as Maximilian I and Christa Théret as Mary of Burgundy. The series was directed by Andreas Prochaska.
- He is portrayed by Iain Batchelor in the 2017 The White Princess (miniseries).
- He is played by Anthony Sourdeau in the 2018 documentary Le Jeu des alliances (1461-1483) (episode 3, season 1 of the series La Guerre des trônes - La véritable histoire de l'Europe by Alain Brunard and Vanessa Pontet).
- Maximilian und sein Tirol is a 2019 ORF TV documentary about the emperor, in commemoration of the 500th anniversary of his death.

=== Others ===
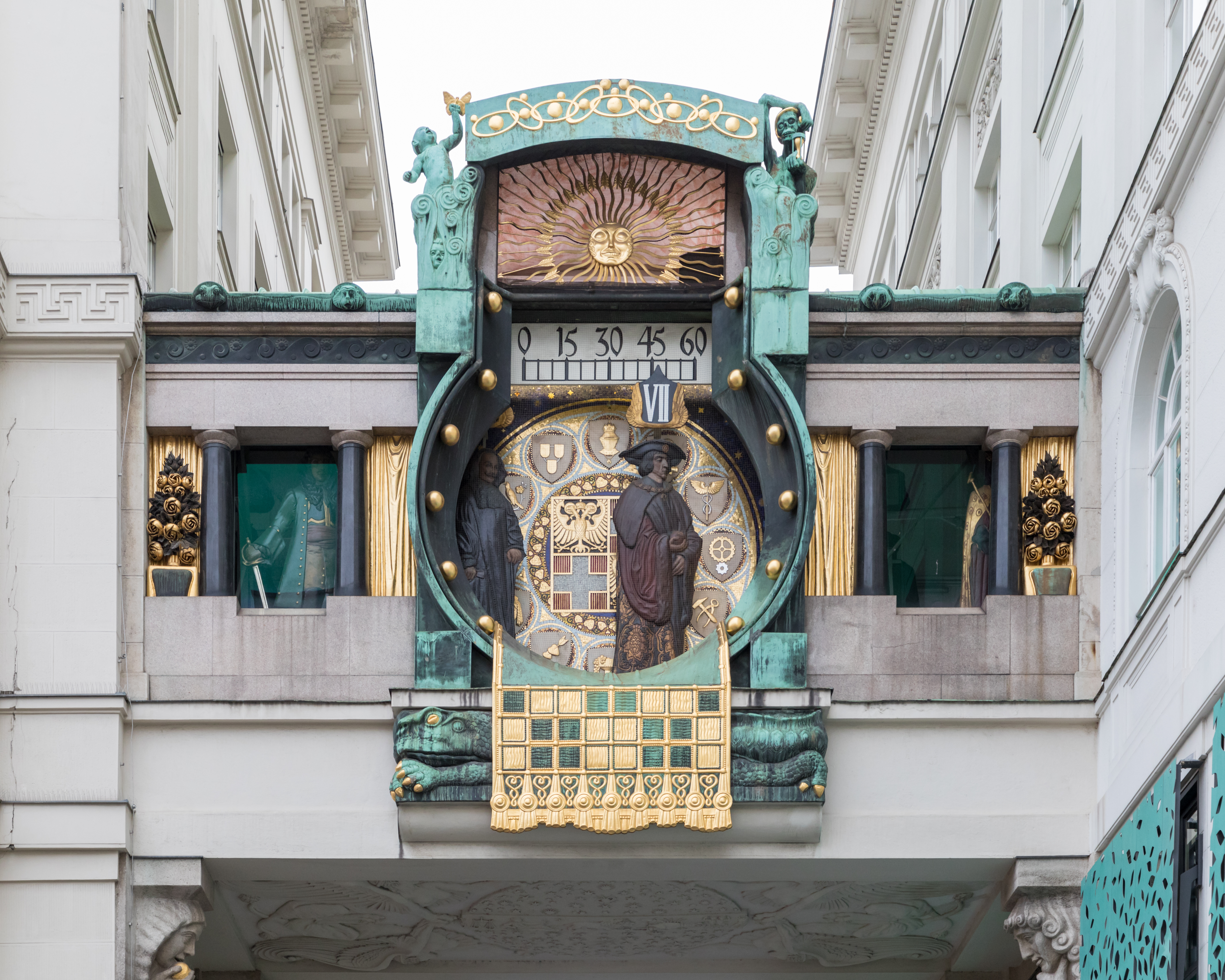
The Ankeruhr

- There's a clock called the Ankeruhr (Anchor Clock) in Vienna, that shows major historical characters. Maximilian appears at 7 o'clock together with the song Innsbruck, ich muss dich lassen.
- Partly because Maximilian, together with Franz von Taxis, was the founder of the modern postal service, stamps and other postal items have been issued in commemoration of him and others involved in the development of early postal service. Examples: 1995 stamp issued by Deutsche Bundespost on commemoration of the 1495 Reichstag in Worms; 1947 stamp issued in commemoration of the granting of trade fair rights to Leipzig in 1497.
- In 1969, a medal in commemoration of the 450th anniversary of Maximilian and Mary's marriage was presented by the Burgermeister of Innsbruck to Queen Elizabeth II on the occasion of her state visit to Austria.
- The tradition of the Fools' guild in Tiengen dates back to the year 1503, when Maximilian gave guilds in Tiengen the right to disparage the authorities on three days each year without fear of punishments.

== Commemoration ==
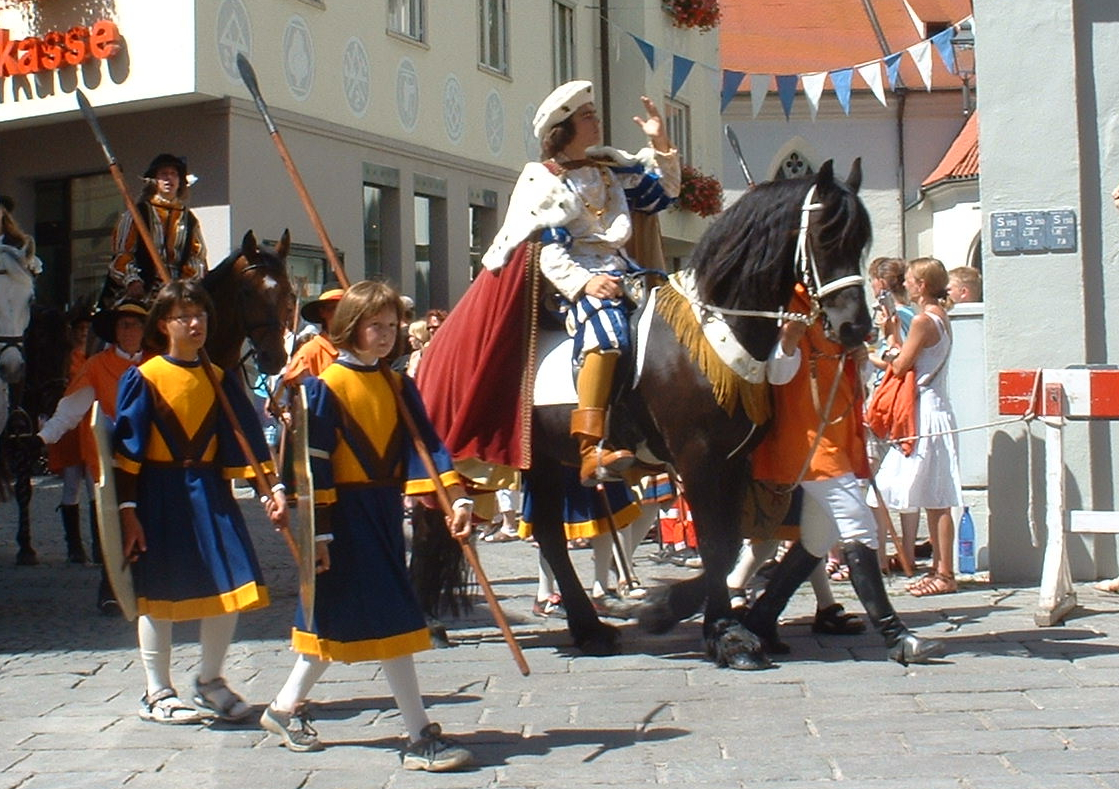
The Tänzelfest, the oldest children's festival in Bavaria, which is organized yearly in Kaufbeuren and traces its origin to Maximilian, returned in 2022 after two years of suspension due to the COVID-19 pandemic.

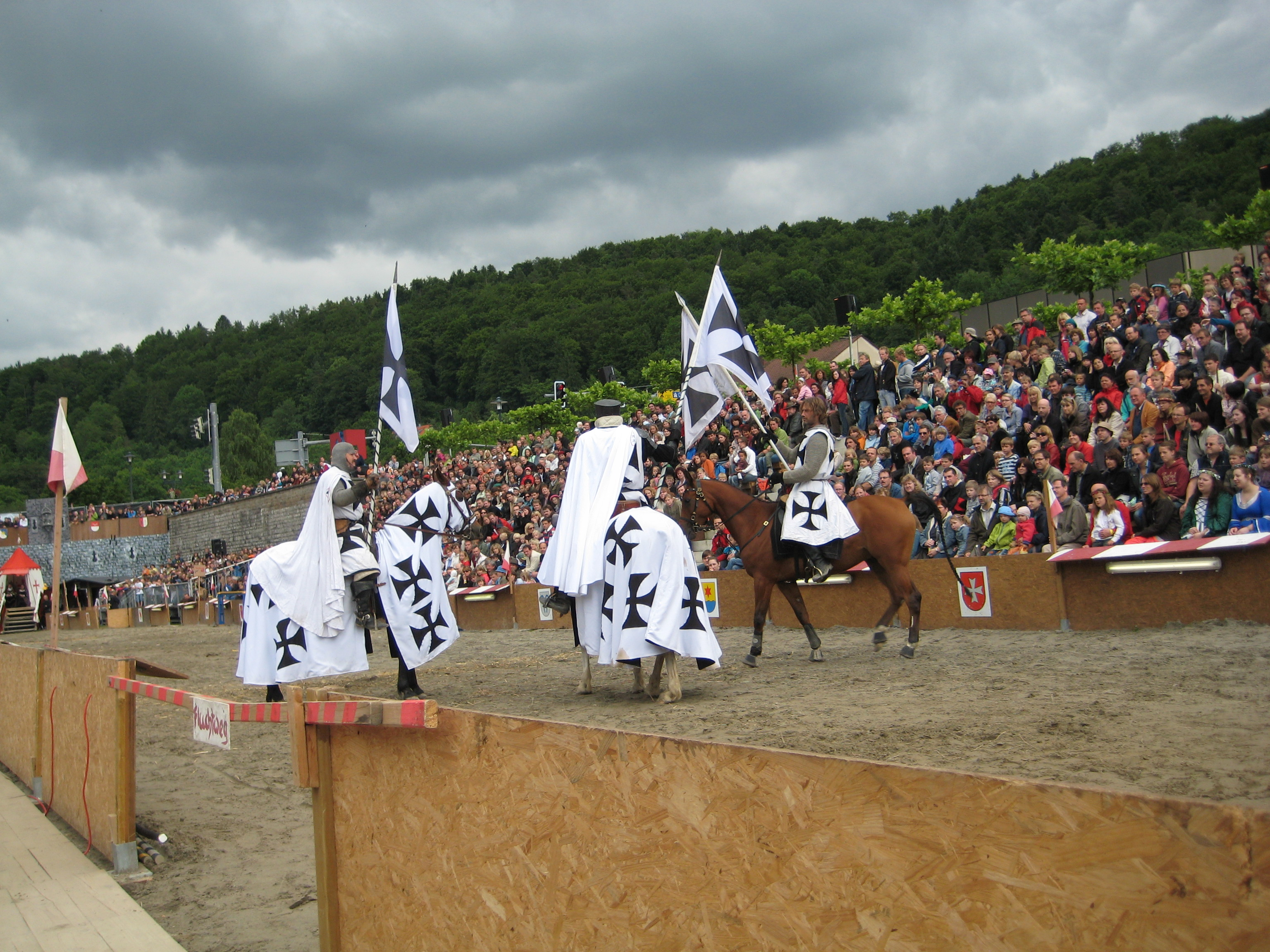
The Maximilian Ritterspiele in Horb am Neckar, one of the largest Medieval shows in Europe. The 2022 event featured a play about the 1498 deposition of Eberhard im Bard by Maxmilian.

In 2022, The Hague named a street after him.

Due to "enormous demand", the exhibition Wir Friedrich III. & Maximilian I. in Admont Abbey, Austria, has been reopened (19 March to 1 November 2022).

In July, Füssen will organize the Füssen in der Renaissance event to commemorate the golden era under Maximilian, with parades, reenactment and a colloquium named "Füssen in the time of Maximilian" (Füssen zur Zeit Maximilians I.). A commemoration board for the emperor (Kaisertafel) was erectedin 2022. In September, Wenzenbach (Regensburg) will commemorate the Battle of Wenzenbach of 1504, one of the last knight battles, with the festival Der letzte Ritter ("The last knight"). In October 2022, Lindau commemorated the 600th year of their Old City Hall (Alte Rathaus) and also the Reichstag of 1496 when Maximilian, the court and princes came to the town.

From October 2022 to April 2023, a great exhibition in Speyer named Die Habsburger im Mittelalter. Aufstieg einer Dynastie traced the rise of the Habsburg dynasty from the time of Rudolf I to its emergence as a European power under Maximilian.

== Historiography ==
=== Maximilian as ruler of the Holy Roman Empire and Austria ===
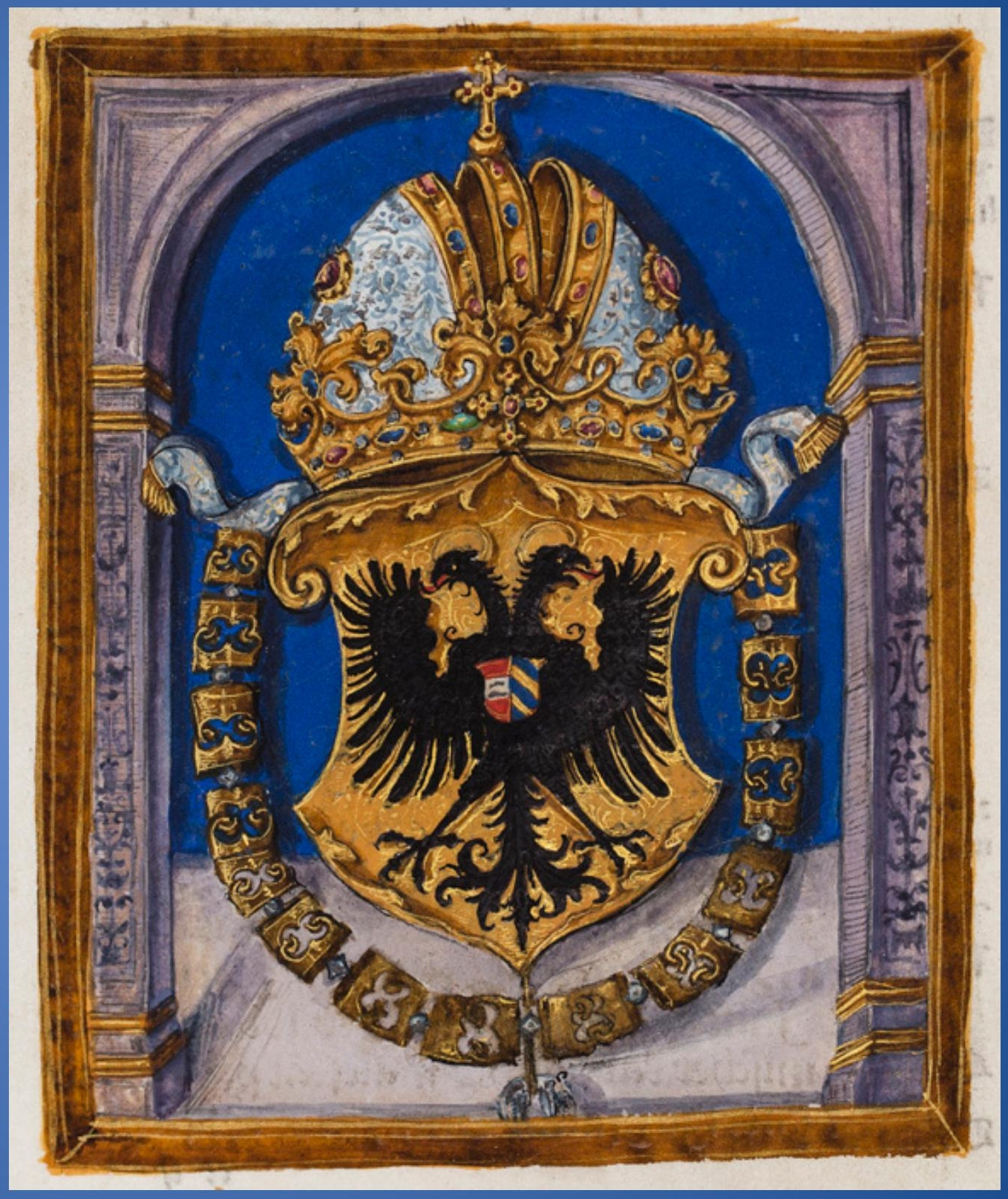
Coat of arms of Maximilian I in the printed book Das leiden Jesu Christi unnsers erlösers by Wolfgang von Maen, printed by Johann Schönsperger the Younger, 1515. The book was commissioned by the emperor. Miniature by Hans Burgkmair.

Maximilian has been an attractive subject of scholarly research since the 18th century. Serious academic research began in the nineteenth century with Heinrich Ulmann's two-volume work Kaiser Maximilian I., which criticized the emperor's focus on dynastic interests and failure to cooperate with the Estates on the Imperial reform in a constructive manner. Leopold von Ranke and his school, who did huge damage to the reputation of the emperor, also criticized Maximilian's lack of attention to imperial affairs, which in their view hampered the unification process of the German nation. Ever since Austrian historian Hermann Wiesflecker's Kaiser Maximilian I. (1971–1986) became the standard work, a much more positive image of the emperor has emerged. He is seen as an essentially modern, innovative ruler who carried out important reforms and promoted significant cultural achievements, even if the financial price weighed hard on the Austrians and his military expansion caused the deaths and sufferings of tens of thousands of people. According to Wiesflecker, Maximilian's critics in the nineteenth century overly relied on archived imperial estates sources, which tended to paint a one-sided character. Besides, the rise of nationalism and anti-Habsburg feelings in the nineteenth century made the emperor an easy target. Historian Joachim Whaley opines that the criticisms of nineteenth century works cannot stand in light of new evidences, and that: "If the aspiration was always greater than the reality, Maximilian's government in the Reich at least demonstrated a greater vitality and power than that of any of his predecessors."

While Austrian historians like Wiesflecker and Holleger consider Maximilian's efforts in Austria, where he left stable institutions and what would mature into the Danube monarchy, as much more successful than in the Empire (although these historians put the blame on the resistance of the princes and the nature of the era, that did not support a strong centralized authority anymore), recent German historians like Seyboth and Wüst stress the modernization aspect that the Imperial Reform brought and tie the development to the person of Maximilian, whose charisma, personality and politics allowed previously unavailable dynamics which, in particular, made possible a dynamic European policy and facilitated the evolution of the Reichstag and the Imperial Circles, which in turn opened up opportunities for corporate participation from the Estates as well as exercise of particular policies regarding police, coinage or sanity issues. According to Wüst, the creation of Imperial Circles would profoundly affect the modernization process of Europe in general too. Heinig comments that recent research, particularly Seyboth's work, convincingly show that the emperor's role in the operation of the political system should be rated much higher than before, or in the other words, "conceptual, communicative and organizational resources derived from the Habsburgs" are shown to be of paramount importance, and that the death of Frederick III (who was completely inaccessible regarding reform attempts) in 1493 was "the real turning point in imperial history".

Another usually debated problem is how much Maximilian's political activities in his patrimonial lands was influenced by the Burgundian model and his "Burgundian experience" in general. Wiesflecker sees the Burgundian model's influence as predominant, Jean-Marie Cauchies und Manfred Hollegger emphasize the role of authochthonous institutions and procedures, while Wim Blockmans and Nicolette Mout note the new communication techniques imported from Italy (with the combo of patronage, book printing and propaganda). Franca Leverotti opines that the administrative reforms in the 1490s seemed to be affected by Milanese influence rather than Burgundian influence. Heribert Müller opines that unlike what happened between Mary and Maximilian, between Maximilian and the Burgundian Netherlands (after Mary's death), there was hardly a love history, but rather, "a history of misunderstandings, violence, and in the end, the scaffold and the prison", so he had no personal nor political motivation to emulate such a model in his own patrimonial lands. Susanne Wolf remarks that the Burgundian legacy from his first wife shaped Maximilian in terms of culture and way of life and preserving this legacy was often the main driving force in the seven years (1486–1493) he shared a double government (Doppelregierung) with his father (who feared that the effort to retain Burgundy would destabilize their Austrian hereditary lands). Wolf sees the double government era as the period that shaped Maximilian as a statesman though.

=== Maximilian as ruler of Burgundian lands ===
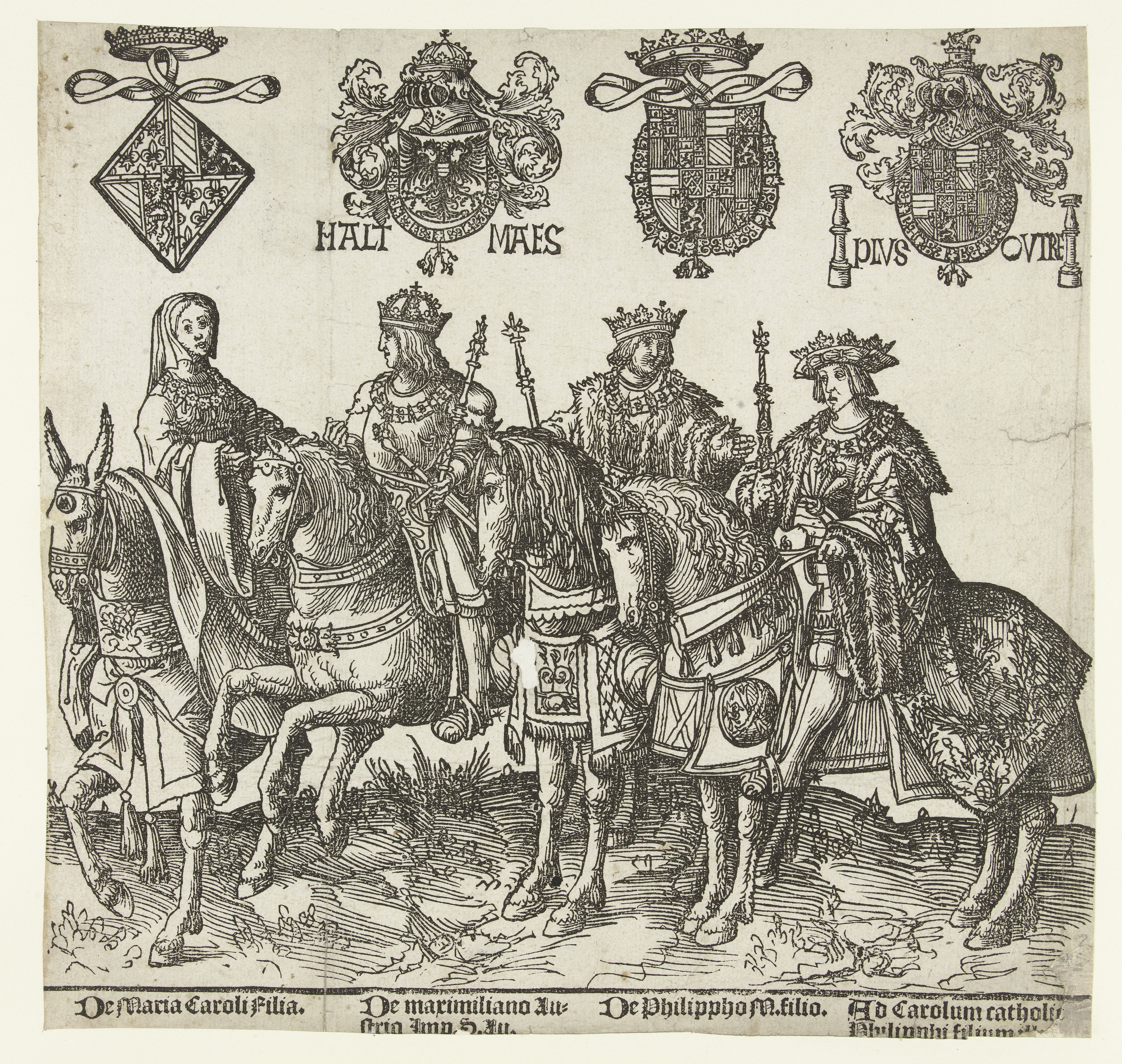
1518 version

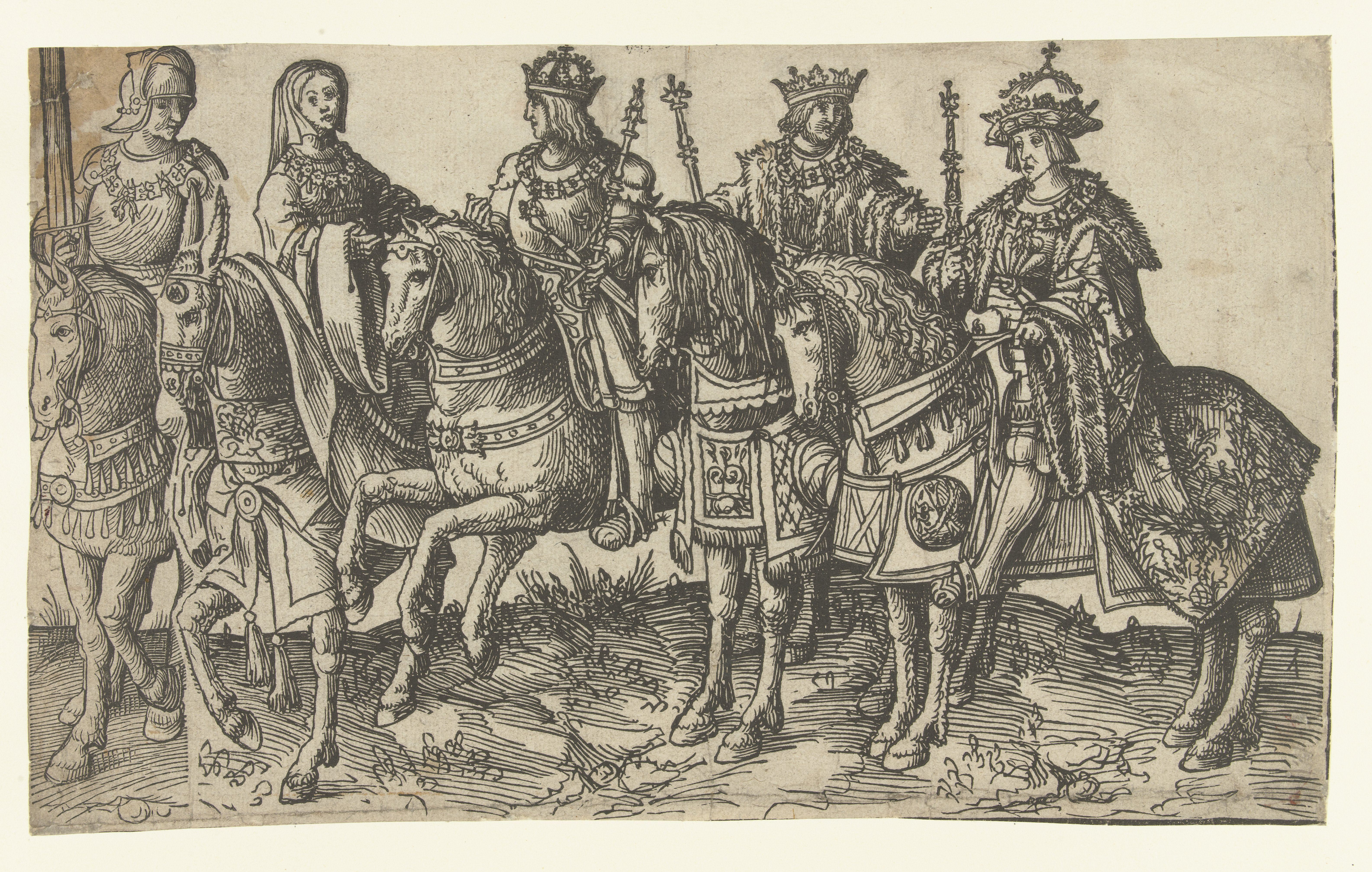
1519 – 1550 version

Maximilian as one of the counts of Holland (Graven en Gravinnen van Holland). The version made during Charles V's reign adds Charles the Bold. By Jacob Cornelisz van Oostsanen.

In the Netherlands and Belgium, traditionally Maximilian's rule, especially his regency (1482–1494), has been the subject of considerable controversies. However, comprehensive studies are rare. Serious research began in the nineteenth century with the historian Louis Gilliodts-Van Severen. In Germany, Friedrich Schiller wrote a work (translated into English by Thomas Horne as History of the Rise and Progress of the Belgian Republic, Until the Revolution Under Philip II.: Including a Detail of the Primary Causes of that Memorable Event) that took the side of his opponents and criticized Maximilian's leadership. After World War II, when historians began to focus on political protests, the debate on the regency was revived with Robert Wellens's 1965 work, the first comprehensive study on the Bruges revolt of 1488 as well as Wim Blockmans's 1974 article. Both historians see the revolt as the conflict between medieval cities that desired autonomy with a more modern, autocratic regime. Jelle Haemer's more recent, highly rated work De strijd om het regentschap over Filips de Schone : opstand, facties en geweld in Brugge, Gent en Ieper (1482–1488), that focuses more on the figures and political groups that supported or fought against Maximilian, presents the conflict not as a matter between the autocratic prince and his people, but two groups that supported different ideologies – both made mistakes and both had their points.

Regarding Maximilian as an individual, commentators tend to rate his military ability and skills as an organizer highly, while noting that his personal ambitions, his highly autocratic style (although, he and his governments were willing to show leniency; in the Empire, Maximilian had a reputation of leaning towards the gentle, conciliatory side, even if not without outbursts of violence.), reckless fiscal practices and problems in addressing his political opponents' grievances exacerbated his side's difficulties. Regarding the question of who preserved the Burgundian nation and saved it from being swallowed by the French polity, Koenigsberger opines that it was the Estates, Jean Berenger and C.A. Simpson argue that it was Maximilian, while Haemers and Spufford point to the combination of Maximilian's military leadership and the Estates' support (especially on financial matters). Bart Lambert remarks that he was more autocratic than his Burgundian predecessors. He had come with almost no help from the Empire, and basically functioned as a condottiere, relying only on his own military ability to survive politically and depending on the resources of the Low Countries to build up his military force.

Holleger and Štih comment that the autocratic style, together with his visionary appetite, gave him troubles not only in Burgundian lands, but in Austria and the Holy Roman Empire also, yet reality and the will of his subjects often managed to restrain the ruler and forged his visions into more well-considered strategies.

=== Dynastic empire building ===
Traditionally, the Habsburg empire's formation has been association with the Latin couplet "Bella gerant alii, tu felix Austria nube" ("Let others wage war: thou, happy Austria, marry"). This was also part of the imperial strategy to show the empire in its civil aspect and promote mutual acceptance in their multi-ethnic empire.

Modern research explores the multifaceted nature of the dynasty's (and above all, Maximilian's) dynastic empire building, concerning its formation and maintenance or development, as well as its relation to the Holy Roman Empire.

Responding to the opinion that the Habsburg's dynastic concerns were damaging to the Holy Roman Empire, Whaley writes that, "There was no fundamental incompatibility between dynasticism and participation in the empire, either for the Habsburgs or for the Saxons or others." Rather, the Habsburgs only inherited the German imperial dynasties' tradition in combining the implications of their imperial title with inheritance and marriage strategies and (usually defensive) wars in building their dynastic empire. As the new empire, "arguably more universal in potential than any previous imperial dynasty", needed resources to defend itself, Maximilian and his descendants exerted more pressure on German estates so that they could receive more organized assistance, which in the end led to the Imperial Reform.

Regarding his diplomacy, while there was an unforeseeable factor concerning the marriages he arranged, recent scholarship also takes note of the diplomatic web (consisting of around 300 individuals, mostly from lower nobility and the bourgeoisie) he built and deployed all over Europe. Jean-Marie Cauchies agrees with Gregor M. Metzig, author of the work Kommunikation und Konfrontation: Diplomatie und Gesandtschaftswesen Kaiser Maximilians I. (1486–1519) (2016), that the network contributed strongly to the heights the Habsburg dynasty later reached. The chief actors in this network, who were very capable officials but now largely forgotten, were Konrad Stürtzel, Zyprian von Serntein, Paul von Liechtenstein, Melchior von Meckau, Wolfgang von Polheim, Pietro Bonomo, Francesco Delli Monti, Giorgio Della Torre, Andrea Da Burgo...etc and perhaps most importantly Matthäus Lang, together with diplomats Maximilian inherited from the Burgundian system such as Jean Bontemps, Jacques de Gondebault or Philibert Naturelli. Together with the latter group, there was a transfer of knowledge in a wide range of matters from alliance planning to financial management. Additionally, while the whole network suffered from chronic underfunding, the Burgundian side of the system, which was especially important in negotiations with France or Iberian kingdoms, was always better organized in terms of financial matters and personnel. Moreover, the Burgundian government and above all its ruler, namely Philip at first and then Margaret especially, functioned as the contact center or head (Meldekopf) of the whole Habsburg Western policy, as Maximilian ran an itinerant court and thus was in no position to manage it personally.

German historían Klaus Oschema argues that Philip and Margaret played a crucial role in the Habsburgs's expansion into Western Europe. The situation with the Burgundy-Habsburg alliance was complex and their ascension in Spain was far from being guaranteed but Philip and Margaret were able to shape the situation and made the father's calculation a success.

Recent research also links the development of the Habsburgs' dynastic empire and the first modern postal network (and the ensuing Early Modern communication revolution), which can be considered both a result as well as a factor in that development process. In his work Kommunikation und Konfrontation. Diplomatie und Gesandtschaftswesen Kaiser Maximilians I. (1486-1519), Gregor Metzig explores in depth the complementary and parallel relationship of this communication system, created by Maximilian in combination with the Taxis and developed further by his son Philip and grandson Charles V, and the Habsburg diplomatic system mentioned above.

=== Maximilian as cultural figure ===
Regarding Maximilian's cultural activities and relationship with artistic, technological and general social developments, notable recent collective works include Maximilians Welt. Kaiser Maximilian I. im Spannungsfeld zwischen Innovation und Tradition (edited by Johannes Helmrath, Ursula Kocher and Andrea Sieber. 2018), Maximilians Ruhmeswerk: Künste und Wissenschaften im Umkreis Kaiser Maximilians I. (edited by Jan-Dirk Müller, Hans-Joachim Ziegeler. 2015) and Maximilian I. (1459 –1519): Wahrnehmung — Ubersetzungen — Gender) (edited by Heinz Noflatscher, Michael A. Chisholm, and Bertrand Schnerb. 2011).

Reviewing the latter, Joachim Whaley links Maximilian's political success to activities in these fields:

Increasingly he is now viewed as an enterprising, visionary ruler who constructed an extraordinary imperial position out of his diverse inheritance and laid the foundations for the role the Habsburgs' played in Europe into the twentieth century. At the same time Maximilian's diverse talents as a writer, patron, artist, and architect of his own grandiose vision of kingship and empire are recognized as integral to his success. If he seemed devoted to a medieval notion of knighthood, depicting himself as the last knight of a now-bygone heroic age, it is clear that he both understood and successfully manipulated the new media of the print era. Maximilian, it seems, was a protean figure, fully in tune with the complex politics and culture of his age.

The ongoing research on Maximilian as a cultural figure corresponds with the rediscovering of notable personalities and works in his era and especially those who served the emperor. For example, until this day, works written in Latin by even the most notable scholars such as the polymath Conrad Celtes remain largely untranslated. Guido Messling and Larry Silver note that among artists who contributed to Maximilian's projects, the prominent roles of the Italians like Jacopo de' Barbari and Ambrogio de Predis, as well as remarkable artists such as Jörg Kölderer, Bernhard Strigel, Leonhard Beck – whose reputation for some reason tends to remain in obscurity, and even Hans Burgkmair (who was "the most important figure around 1510" and the rival of Dürer) are usually neglected in favour of the late comer Albrecht Dürer.

Notable experts in individual fields include:

- Music: Louise Cuyler (author of the 1973 The Emperor Maximilian I and Music) and Nicole Schwindt (whose 2018 work Maximilians Lieder. Weltliche Musik in deutschen Landen um 1500 has been praised as an opus magnum).
- Armour: Pierre Terjanian (editor of The Last Knight: The Art, Armor, and Ambition of Maximilian I, 2019)
- Iconography: Larry Silver, with his 2008 work Marketing Maximilian: the Visual Ideology of a Holy Roman Emperor.

=== Personality ===
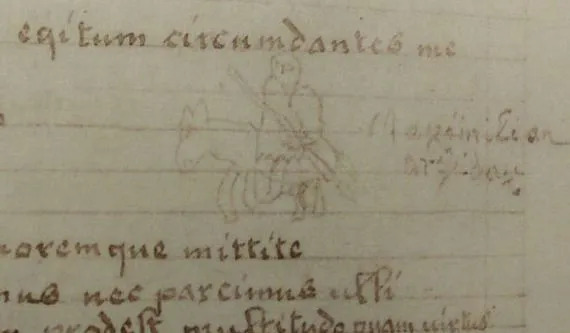
Young Maximilian's doodle of a knight (likely himself) riding a horse, discovered by Natalie Anderson in a textbuch. The text reads "Maximilian archidux". After his mother Eleanor's death, teachers often subjected the boy to sadistic corporal punishments, supported by his father, to force him to study. The bored schoolboy immersed himself in a world of knights and chivalrous stories. Later, artists and artisans would help him to turn this dreamworld into arts and tournaments.

Historian Thomas A.Brady Jr. writes:

King Maximilian I (1459—1519) enjoys perhaps the most unsettled reputation of any figure in German history between the High Middle Ages and the Thirty Years' War. He continues to be presented as 'the last knight' and as 'a convinced reformer' of the Empire; as the renovator of the universal ideal of Christendom and as the founder of the early modern House of Austria; and as a far-sighted builder of states and as an archaic dreamer of hopeless dreams. To a very great degree, the practice of framing Maximilian in such antinomies reflects a conscious desire "to create the illusion of a clash between the old and the new" which is "epitomized by the figure of the Emperor Maximilian." There is nevertheless a truly historical basis for this divided image. Socially and culturally, Jan-Dirk Müller writes, Maximilian's immediate milieu stands between two distinctly different worlds [...] The split image of Maximilian, with all of its confusion and contradiction, is both historiographical and historical.

Overall, there are relatively few biographies of Maximilian (there is no straightforward biography of the emperor written in English). Historian Paula Fichtner opines that some biographies are of questionable quality, too. According to Fichtner, the critical work Maximilian I, 1459–1519: An Analytic Biography by Gerhard Benecke (1982) is a sincere contribution to the field of court history as social history, but misrepresents the emperor's character. By contrast, there are a large number of works that focus on one aspect of his reign or cultural phenomena as reflected by Maximilian. According to Natalie Anderson, other than Benecke's work, Glenn Elwood Waas's 1941 work The Legendary Character of Kaiser Maximilian is probably the most useful general portrait of the emperor published in English (although this work is also not a biography, but a survey of how the emperor was viewed in contemporary literature).

Historian Reinhard Seyboth notes that it is hard for biographers to meet many challenges in dealing with Maximilian, the great Habsburg ruler "who combined the characteristics of the old and new ages like no other", not only because of his extravagant multifacetedness, but also because of the complexities of his era. Primary sources on the emperor and his reign are still being explored. His extant imperial regesta (containing "deeds, letters, records, chancery and chamber files, diplomatic correspondence, contemporary sources in general and contemporary historiographic sources etc."), collected under the leadership of Hermann Wiesflecker, include around 500,000 documents, of which roughly 40,000 selected documents have been published under the name Ausgewählten Regesten des Kaiserreiches unter Maximilian I.. The series Mittlere Reihe – Deutsche Reichstagsakten unter Maximilian I. ("German Reichstag documents under Maximilian I.") has reached the eleventh volume and covered his reign as German king and Holy Roman Emperor until 1512. The latest volume is Bd. 11 (2017) Die Reichstage zu Augsburg 1510 und Trier/Köln 1512. The twelfth volume will be published in 2022.

One matter over which nineteenth century historians like Ulmann as well as more modern commentators often agree is that Maximilian was a very charismatic leader. Many contemporaries found his character and his politics problematic, but they loved him anyway (although they still fought hard to restrain their ruler).

Maximilian was loyal to his confidants, officials and servants. In return, disloyalty in the imperial court was hardly known. The chancellor, Cyprian von Serntein, was even mocked for forgetting God and treating his emperor as God. Hirschbiegel notes that this was Maximilian's recipe for success, as premodern ruling depended on the confidants, who pushed for or implemented the ruler's policies.

Andreas Zajic, who is leading the large interdisciplinary project "Managing Maximilian", remarks that he would be considered a control freak by today's standards, "The most surprising thing was that Maximilian dealt with huge, revolutionary problems on the same day and then went back to regulating his own needs down to the last detail." He saw himself as expert in almost areas. He considered spontaneous ideas like crusading against the Ottomans or becoming Pope as almost as important as big politics.

== See also ==
Wikipedia articles

- Representations of Anne of Brittany
- Cultural depictions of Charles V, Holy Roman Emperor
- Cultural depictions of Otto I, Holy Roman Emperor
- Cultural depictions of Otto III, Holy Roman Emperor
- Cultural depictions of Conrad II, Holy Roman Emperor
- Cultural depictions of Frederick I, Holy Roman Emperor
- Cultural depictions of Frederick II, Holy Roman Emperor
- Cultural depictions of Charles IV, Holy Roman Emperor
- Cultural depictions of Sigismund, Holy Roman Emperor
- Ambraser Heldenbuch
- Feast of the Rosary
- Flemish revolts against Maximilian of Austria
- Freydal
- Hunts of Maximilian
- Innsbruck, ich muss dich lassen
- Large Triumphal Carriage
- Maximilian (miniseries)
- Portrait of Emperor Maximilian I
- Theuerdank
- Triumphal Arch (woodcut)
- Triumphal Procession
- Virgo Prudentissima (Heinrich Isaac)
- Weisskunig

From Wikimedia Commons

- Freydal, PDF file
- Theuerdank, PDF file
- Book of Armaments of Emperor Maximilian I, 1502, PDF file

== Bibliography and further reading ==
=== Maximilian and astrology ===
- Hayton, Darin (4 December 2015). The Crown and the Cosmos: Astrology and the Politics of Maximilian I. University of Pittsburgh Press. ISBN 978-0-8229-8113-8.

=== Communication and cryptography ===
- Augustyn, Wolfgang; Lange-Krach, Heidrun; Löser, Freimut; Müller, Jan-Dirk (2022). Maximilian I. und die Buchkultur. Passau: Dietmar Klinger Verlag. ISBN 978-3-86328-191-5.
- Behringer, Wolfgang (2003). Im Zeichen des Merkur: Reichspost und Kommunikationsrevolution in der Frühen Neuzeit (in German). Vandenhoeck & Ruprecht. ISBN 978-3-525-35187-1.
- Metzig, Gregor (21 November 2016). Kommunikation und Konfrontation: Diplomatie und Gesandtschaftswesen Kaiser Maximilians I. (1486–1519) (in German). Walter de Gruyter GmbH & Co KG. ISBN 978-3-11-045457-4.
- Walder, Anton (2015). Kryptographie unter Kaiser Maximilian I. (1. Aufl ed.). Saarbrücken. ISBN 978-3-639-46730-7.
- Wood, Christopher S. (15 August 2008). Forgery, Replica, Fiction: Temporalities of German Renaissance Art. University of Chicago Press. p. 177. ISBN 978-0-226-90597-6.

=== Literature ===
- Boor, Helmut de (1949). Geschichte Der Deutschen Literatur: pt.1 Die deutsche Literatur vom späten Mittelalter bis zum Barock: das ausgehende Mittelalter, Humanismus und Renaissance, 1370–1520 (in German). Beck.
- Dietl, Cora (22 August 2008). Die Dramen Jacob Lochers und die frühe Humanistenbühne im süddeutschen Raum (in German). Walter de Gruyter. ISBN 978-3-11-020158-1.
- Füssel, Stephan (1987). Riccardus Bartholinus Perusinus. Humanistische Panegyrik am Hofe Kaiser Maximilians I. - Baden-Baden: Koerner 1987. 375 S. 8° (in German). V. Koerner. ISBN 978-3-87320-416-4.
- Janssen, Johannes (1905). History of the German People at the Close of the Middle Ages. K. Paul, Trench, Trübner.
- Klarer, Mario (2019). Kaiser Maximilian I. und das Ambraser Heldenbuch. Wien. ISBN 978-3-205-23265-0.
- Luh, Peter (2001). Kaiser Maximilian gewidmet: die unvollendete Werkausgabe des Conrad Celtis und ihre Holzschnitte (in German). P. Lang. ISBN 978-3-631-36686-8.
- McDonald, William C.; Goebel, Ulrich (1973). German Medieval Literary Patronage from Charlemagne to Maximilian I: A Critical Commentary with Special Emphasis on Imperial Promotion of Literature. Rodopi.
- Müller, Jan-Dirk (1982). Gedechtnus: Literatur und Hofgesellschaft um Maximilian I. (in German). W. Fink. ISBN 978-3-7705-1930-9.
- Müller, Gernot Michael (2010). Humanismus und Renaissance in Augsburg: Kulturgeschichte einer Stadt zwischen Spätmittelalter und Dreissigjährigem Krieg (in German). Walter de Gruyter. ISBN 978-3-11-023124-3.
- Pulina, Dennis (7 February 2022). Kaiser Maximilian I. als Held im lateinischen Epos: Ein Beitrag zur Methodik epischer Heroisierungen und zur Aktualisierung antiker Heldennarrative (in German). Walter de Gruyter GmbH & Co KG. p. 255. ISBN 978-3-11-074260-2.
- RatzenbeißEr, Ernst (1936). Kaiser Maximilian I., Freydal und Weißkunig als turngeschichtliche Quellen.
- Strobl, Joseph (12 July 2018). Studien über die literarische Tätigkeit Kaiser Maximilian I. (in German). Walter de Gruyter GmbH & Co KG. ISBN 978-3-11-148391-7.
- Williams, Gerhild Scholz (1982). The Literary World of Maximilian I: An Annotated Bibliography. Center for Reformation Research.

=== Music ===
- Antonicek, Theophil; Fritz, Elisabeth Theresia; Hilscher, Elisabeth Theresia; Krones, Hartmut (1999). Die Wiener Hofmusikkapelle: Georg von Slatkonia und die Wiener Hofmusikkapelle (in German). Böhlau. ISBN 978-3-205-98923-3.
- Cuyler, Louise (1973). The Emperor Maximilian I and Music. Oxford University Press. ISBN 978-0-19-315223-6.
- Griffel, Margaret Ross (23 January 2018). Operas in German: A Dictionary. Rowman & Littlefield. ISBN 978-1-4422-4797-0.
- Henning, Uta (1987). Musica Maximiliana: die Musikgraphiken in den bibliophilen Unternehmungen Kaiser Maximilians I.: with an English summary. Neu-Ulm: Stegmiller. ISBN 978-3-923928-02-6.
- Nordstrom, Lyle Elmer (1968). A Concert of Music from the Courts of Maximilian I. Stanford University.
- Salmen, Walter (1997). Heinrich Isaac und Paul Hofhaimer im Umfeld von Kaiser Maximilian I: Bericht über die vom 1. bis 5. Juli 1992 in Innsbruck abgehaltene Fachtagung (in German). Edition Helbling. ISBN 978-3-85061-077-3.
- Salmen, Walter (1992). Musik und Tanz zur Zeit Kaiser Maximilian I.: Bericht über die am 21. und 22. Oktober 1989 in Innsbruck abgehaltene Fachtagung (in German). Helbling. ISBN 978-3-900590-14-7.
- Schwindt, Nicole (3 December 2018). Maximilians Lieder: Weltliche Musik in deutschen Landen um 1500 (in German). J.B. Metzler. ISBN 978-3-476-04677-2.
- Weaver, Andrew H., ed. (25 September 2020). A Companion to Music at the Habsburg Courts in the Sixteenth and Seventeenth Centuries. BRILL. ISBN 978-90-04-43503-2.

Articles and book chapters

- McDonald, Grantley (2019). "The Chapel of Maximilian I: Patronage and Mobility in a European Context". In Gasch, Stefan; Grassl, Markus; Valentin Rabe, August (eds.). Henricus Isaac (c. 1450/5–1517) Composition – Reception – Interpretation. Hollitzer Verlag. pp. 9–23.
- Nowak, Leopold. "Zur Geschichte der Musik am Hofe Kaiser Maximilians I.", in: Mitteilungen des Vereines für Geschichte der Stadt Wien 12 (1932): 71–91.
- Senn, Walter. "Maximilian und die Musik", in: Ausstellungskatalog : Maximilian I. in Innsbruck, Innsbruck 1969.

=== Tournaments, hunting and war culture ===
- Anderson, Natalie Margaret (March 2017). The Tournament and its Role in the Court Culture of Emperor Maximilian I (1459–1519) (PDF). The University of Leeds, Institute for Medieval Studies. pp. 5–7. Archived (PDF) from the original on 14 June 2021.
- Cuneo, Pia F. (2002a). Artful Armies, Beautiful Battles: Art and Warfare in the Early Modern Europe. BRILL. ISBN 978-90-04-11588-0.
- Kirchhoff, Chassica (6 June 2023). The Thun-Hohenstein Album: Cultures of Remembrance in a Paper Armory. Boydell & Brewer. ISBN 978-1-83765-043-9.
- Terjanian, Pierre, ed. (2 October 2019). The Last Knight: The Art, Armor, and Ambition of Maximilian I. Metropolitan Museum of Art. ISBN 978-1-58839-674-7.
- Wrede, Martin (23 May 2014). Die Inszenierung der heroischen Monarchie: Frühneuzeitliches Königtum zwischen ritterlichem Erbe und militärischer Herausforderung (in German). Walter de Gruyter GmbH & Co KG. pp. 57–75, 317–323. ISBN 978-3-486-78107-6.

=== Visual arts ===
- Altdorfer, Albrecht; Guillaud, Ed (1985). Altdorfer and Fantastic Realism in German Art. Guillaud Editions. ISBN 978-0-8478-5410-3.
- Auwera, Joost Vander; Sprang, Sabine Van, eds. (2007). Rubens: A Genius at Work: the Works of Peter Paul Rubens in the Royal Museums of Fine Arts of Belgium Reconsidered. Lannoo Uitgeverij. ISBN 978-90-209-7242-9.
- Bibliothek, Österreichisches Museum für Angewandte Kunst; Egger, Hanna; Kunst, Österreichisches Museum für Angewandte (1971). Albrecht Dürer und die Druckgraphik für Kaiser Maximilian I. (in German). Österr. Museum f. Angewandte Kunst.
- Buchanan, Iain (2015). Habsburg Tapestries. Brepols. ISBN 978-2-503-51670-7.
- Burgoyne, Christa L. (1979). The Prayerbook of Emperor Maximilian I: Art Making and Its Circumstance. University of California, Berkeley.
- Bossmeyer, Christine (2015). Visuelle Geschichte in den Zeichnungen und Holzschnitten zum 'Weisskunig' Kaiser Maximilians I. (in German). Thorbecke. ISBN 978-3-7995-1011-0.
- Campbell, Thomas P. (2002). Tapestry in the Renaissance: Art and Magnificence. Metropolitan Museum of Art. ISBN 978-1-58839-022-6.
- Carl, Klaus H. (15 September 2015). German Painting. Parkstone International. ISBN 978-1-78310-793-3.
- Cashion, Debra; Luttikhuizen, Henry; West, Ashley (21 August 2017). The Primacy of the Image in Northern European Art, 1400–1700: Essays in Honor of Larry Silver. BRILL. ISBN 978-90-04-35412-8.
- Cuneo, Pia F. (1998). Art and Politics in Early Modern Germany: Jörg Breu the Elder and the Fashioning of Political Identity, ca. 1475–1536. BRILL. ISBN 978-90-04-11184-4.
- Cuneo, Pia F. (2002b). Images of Warfare as Political Legitimization: Jörg Breu the Elderś Rondels for Maximilian Iś Hunting Lodge at Lermos (ca. 1516).
- Eörsi, Anna (2020). ""Imaige a la Vierge Marie"; The Hours of Mary of Burgundy, Her Marriage, and Her Painter, Hugo van der Goes". Acta Historiae Artium. 61 (1): 19–53. doi:10.1556/170.2020.00002. S2CID 234506689.
- Jecmen, Gregory; Spira, Freyda (2012). Imperial Augsburg: Renaissance Prints and Drawings, 1475–1540. Ashgate Publishing, Ltd. ISBN 978-1-84822-122-2.
- Hartmann, Wolfgang (1977). Kaiser Maximilian I. und Albrecht Dürer: ein Künstlerfest der Spätromantik und sein Anspruch (in German). Stadtgeschichtlichen Museen Nürnberg.
- Kohler, Alfred; Schubert, Eva, eds. (2016). Tiroler Ausstellungsstrassen: Maximilian I (in German). Museum With No Frontiers, Museum Ohne Grenzen. ISBN 978-3-902966-03-2.
- Michel, Eva; Sternat, Maria Luise (2012). Emperor Maximilian I and the age of Dürer (PDF). München: Prestel. ISBN 978-3-7913-5172-8. Archived (PDF) from the original on 21 October 2021.
- Schauerte, Thomas Ulrich (2001). Die Ehrenpforte für Kaiser Maximilian I.: Dürer und Altdorfer im Dienst des Herrschers (in German). Deutscher Kunstverlag. ISBN 978-3-422-06331-0.

=== Popular media ===
- Kagerer, Alexander (23 October 2017). Macht und Medien um 1500: Selbstinszenierungen und Legitimationsstrategien von Habsburgern und Fuggern (in German). Walter de Gruyter GmbH & Co KG. ISBN 978-3-11-053911-0.
- Füssel, Stephan (2003). Kaiser Maximilian und die Medien seiner Zeit. Der Theuerdank von 1517: eine kulturhistorische Einführung (in German). Taschen. ISBN 978-3-8228-2189-3.
- Silver, Larry (2008). Marketing Maximilian: The Visual Ideology of a Holy Roman Emperor. Princeton University Press. ISBN 978-0-691-13019-4.

=== Political and military career ===
Primary sources

- Böhmer, J. F., Regesta Imperii XIV. Ausgewählte Regesten des Kaiserreiches unter Maximilian I. 1493–1519. 4 volumes, edited by Wiesflecker, Hermann et al. - Köln (et al.) (1990–2004). Online pdf version
- Mittlere Reihe Deutsche Reichstagsakten unter Maximilian I.
  - Band 1: Reichstag zu Frankfurt 1486. Edited by Heinz Angermeier with the participation of Reinhard Seyboth, Göttingen 1989, 2 Teilbände, VI. 1088 p.
  - Band 2: Reichstag zu Nürnberg 1487. Edited by Reinhard Seyboth, Göttingen 2001, 2 Teilbände, 1174 p.
  - Band 3: Deutsche Reichstagsakten 1488–1490. Edited by Ernst Bock, Göttingen 1972, 2 Teilbände, 1469 p.
  - Band 4: Reichsversammlungen 1491–1493. Edited by Reinhard Seyboth, München 2008, 2 Teilbände, 1402 p.
  - Band 5: Reichstag von Worms 1495. Edited by Heinz Angemeier, Göttingen 1981, 2 Teilbände, XXVI, 1952 p.
  - Band 6: Reichstage von Lindau, Worms und Freiburg 1496–1498. Edited by Heinz Gollwitzer, Göttingen 1979, 798 p.
  - Band 7: Reichstage und Reichsversammlungen sowie Regimentsregierung 1499–1503. Edited by Peter Schmid.
  - Band 8: Der Reichstag zu Köln 1505. Edited by Dietmar Heil, München 2008, 2 Teilbände. 1557 p.
  - Band 9: Der Reichstag zu Konstanz 1507. Edited by Dietmar Heil. München 2014, 2 Teilbände, 1504 p. ISBN 978-3-486-71869-0.
  - Band 10: Der Reichstag zu Worms 1509. Edited by Dietmar Heil. Göttingen 2017. ISBN 978-3-11-054280-6.
  - Band 11: Reichstage zu Augsburg 1510 und Trier/Köln 1512. Edited by Reinhard Seyboth.
  - Band 12: Reichstage zu Worms 1513 und Mainz 1517. Edited by Reinhard Seyboth.

Secondary sources

- Wiesflecker, Hermann (1971). Kaiser Maximilian I. Das Reich, Österreich und Europa an der Wende zur Neuzeit: Der Kaiser und seine Umwelt Hof, Staat, Wirtschaft, Geselleschaft und Kultur (in German). R. Oldenbourg Verlag. ISBN 978-3-7028-0236-3.
- Wiesflecker, Hermann (1971–1986). Kaiser Maximilian I. 5 vols. Munich.
- Benecke, Gerhard (26 June 2019). Maximilian I (1459–1519): An Analytical Biography. Routledge. ISBN 978-1-000-00840-1.
- Blockmans, Willem-Peter (1974). "Autocratie ou polyarchie ? La lutte pour le pouvoir politique en Flandre de 1482 à 1492, d'après des documents inédits". Bulletin de la Commission royale d'Histoire. 140 (140): 257–368. doi:10.3406/bcrh.1974.1372. hdl:1887/1905.
- Brady, Thomas A.; Brady, Thomas A. Jr. (13 July 2009). German Histories in the Age of Reformations, 1400–1650. Cambridge University Press. ISBN 978-0-521-88909-4.
- Haemers, Jelle (2009). For the Common Good: State Power and Urban Revolts in the Reign of Mary of Burgundy, (1477–1482). Isd. ISBN 978-2-503-52986-8.
- Haemers, Jelle (2014). De strijd om het regentschap over Filips de Schone: opstand, facties en geweld in Brugge, Gent en Ieper (1482–1488) (PDF). Gent. ISBN 978-90-382-2400-8.
- Holleger, Manfred (22 September 2005). Maximilian I.: Herrscher und Mensch einer Zeitenwende (in German). Kohlhammer Verlag. ISBN 978-3-17-023247-1.
- Kleinschmidt, Harald (2008). Ruling the Waves: Emperor Maximilian I, the Search for Islands and the Transformation of the European World Picture C. 1500. Brill Academic Pub. ISBN 978-90-6194-020-3.
- Kurzmann, Gerhard (1985). Kaiser Maximilian I. und das Kriegswesen der österreichischen Länder und des Reiches (in German). Österreichischer Bundesverlag. ISBN 978-3-215-06067-0.
- Koenigsberger, H. G. (22 November 2001). Monarchies, States Generals and Parliaments: The Netherlands in the Fifteenth and Sixteenth Centuries. Cambridge University Press. p. 70. ISBN 978-0-521-80330-4.
- Ranke, Leopold von (1867). Deutsche Geschichte im Zeitalter der Reformation (in German). Duncker und Humblot.
- Rapp, Francis (2007). Maximilien d'Autriche: souverain du Saint Empire romain germanique, bâtisseur de la maison d'Autriche, 1459–1519 (in French). Paris: Tallandier. ISBN 978-2-84734-053-2.
- Sablon du Corail, Amable (2019). La guerre, le prince et ses sujets: les finances des Pays-Bas bourguignons sous les règnes Marie de Bourgogne et Maximilien d'Autriche. Turnhout: BREPOLS. ISBN 978-2-503-58098-2.
- Spijkers, J.H. (2014). Punished and corrected as an example to all: On the treatment of rebellious nobles during and after the Flemish Revolts (1482–1492) (Masters). Leiden University.
- Spufford, Peter (1970). Monetary Problems and policies in the Burgundian Netherlands, 1433–1496. Brill Archive.
- Tittmann, Wilfried E. (2018). Die Nürnberger Handfeuerwaffen vom Spätmittelalter bis zum Frühbarock: der Beitrag Nürnbergs zur militärischen Revolution der frühen Neuzeit (in German). Adeva. ISBN 978-3-201-02021-3.
- Ulmann, Heinrich (1884). Kaiser Maximilian I.: 1–2. Bd (in German). Cotta.
- Waas, Glenn Elwood (1941). The Legendary Character of Kaiser Maximilian. Columbia University Press.
- Wellens, Robert (1974). Les États généraux des Pays-Bas, des origines à la fin du règne de Philippe le Beau: 1464–1506 (in French). UGA.
- Whaley, Joachim (24 November 2011). Germany and the Holy Roman Empire: Volume II: The Peace of Westphalia to the Dissolution of the Reich, 1648–1806. Oxford: Oxford University Press. p. 72. ISBN 978-0-19-162822-1.
- Whaley, Joachim (2012). Germany and the Holy Roman Empire: Volume I: Maximilian I to the Peace of Westphalia, 1493–1648. Oxford: Oxford University Press. pp. 72–111. ISBN 978-0-19-873101-6.

=== Miscellaneous ===
- Baldass, Ludwig (1923). Der Künstlerkreis Kaiser Maximilians (in German). Verlag nicht ermittelbar.
- Berenger, Jean; Simpson, C. A. (2014). A History of the Habsburg Empire 1273–1700. Routledge. ISBN 978-1-317-89570-1.
- Brandt, Bettina (2010). Germania und ihre Söhne: Repräsentationen von Nation, Geschlecht und Politik in der Moderne (in German). Vandenhoeck & Ruprecht. ISBN 978-3-525-36710-0.
- Debertol, Markus; Gneiß, Markus; Hörmann-Thurn und Taxis, Julia; Hollegger, Manfred; Noflatscher, Heinz; Zajic, Andreas (2022). "Per tot discrimina rerum" - Maximilian I. (1459-1519) (in German) (1. Auflage ed.). Wien. ISBN 978-3-205-21602-5. (full online PDF edition)
- Flood, John (8 September 2011). Poets Laureate in the Holy Roman Empire: A Bio-bibliographical Handbook. Walter de Gruyter. ISBN 978-3-11-091274-6.
- Grössing, Sigrid-Maria (2002). Maximilian I.: Kaiser, Künstler, Kämpfer (in German). Amalthea. ISBN 978-3-85002-485-3.
- Hartmann, Sieglinde (2009). Kaiser Maximilian I. (1459–1519) und die Hofkultur seiner Zeit (in German). Reichert. ISBN 978-3-89500-664-7.
- Hirschi, Caspar (8 December 2011). The Origins of Nationalism: An Alternative History from Ancient Rome to Early Modern Germany. Cambridge University Press. ISBN 978-1-139-50230-6.
- Holland, Clive (1909). Tyrol and Its People. Methuen and Company.
- Holleger, Manfred (2012). "Personality and reign The biography of Emperor Maximilian I". In Michel, Eva; Sternat, Maria Luise (eds.). Emperor Maximilian I and the Age of Durer (PDF). Prestel; Albertina. ISBN 978-3-7913-5172-8.
- Karaskova, Olga (2014). Marie de Bourgogne et le Grand Héritage: l'iconographie princière face aux défis d'un pouvoir en transition (1477–1530), Volume 1. Université Lille Nord de France, Université Charles-de-Gaulle – Lille 3, École doctorale Sciences de l'Homme et de la Société, Centre des recherches IRHiS – UMR 8529, Institut de Recherches Historiques du Septentrion, Musée de l'Ermitage.
- Madersbacher, Lukas; Pokorny, Erwin (2019). Maximilianus: die Kunst des Kaisers ([1. Auflage] ed.). Berlin. ISBN 978-3-422-98038-9.
- Müller, Jan-Dirk; Ziegeler, Hans-Joachim (16 June 2015). Maximilians Ruhmeswerk: Künste und Wissenschaften im Umkreis Kaiser Maximilians I. (in German). Walter de Gruyter. ISBN 978-3-11-038754-4.
- Nakamura, Toshiharu (20 February 2014). Images of Familial Intimacy in Eastern and Western Art. BRILL. ISBN 978-90-04-26194-5.
- Noflatscher, Heinz; Chisholm, Michael; Schnerb, Bertrand, eds. (2011). Maximilian I. (1459–1519): Wahrnehmung – Übersetzungen – Gender (in German). Studien-Verlag. ISBN 978-3-7065-4951-6.
- Rothenberg, David J. (January 2011). "The Most Prudent Virgin and the Wise King: Isaac's Virgo prudentissima Compositions in the Imperial Ideology of Maximilian I". Journal of Musicology. 28 (1): 34–80. doi:10.1525/jm.2011.28.1.34.
- Schmidt-von Rhein, Georg; Baumann, Anette; Gesellschaft für Reichskammergerichtsforschung (2002). Kaiser Maximilian I.: Bewahrer und Reformer (in German). Paqué. ISBN 978-3-935279-33-8.
- Schreiber, Hermann (2008). Ritter, Tod und Teufel: Kaiser Maximilian I. und seine Zeit (in German). C. Katz. ISBN 978-3-938047-34-7.
- Trevor-Roper, Hugh (23 January 1989). Renaissance Essays. University of Chicago Press. ISBN 978-0-226-81227-4.
- Trevor-Roper, Hugh (22 February 2017). Maximilian I. New Word City. ISBN 978-1-64019-024-5.
- Van der Heide, Klaas (2019). "Many Paths Must a Choirbook Tread Before it Reaches the Pope?". Medieval & Early Modern Music from the Low Countries. 11 (1–2): 47–70. doi:10.1484/J.JAF.5.118980. S2CID 213740615.
- Weiss, Sabine (2018). Maximilian I.: Habsburgs faszinierender Kaiser (in German). Tyrolia-Verlag. ISBN 978-3-7022-3709-7.
- Wies, Ernst Wilhelm (2003). Kaiser Maximilian I.: ein Charakterbild (in German). Bechtle. ISBN 978-3-7628-0570-0.
- Winker, Will (April 1950). Kaiser Maximilian I.: Zwischen Wirklichkeit und Traum (in German). Walter de Gruyter GmbH. ISBN 978-3-486-77760-4.
