= Triumphal Arch (woodcut) =

16th-century monumental woodcut print

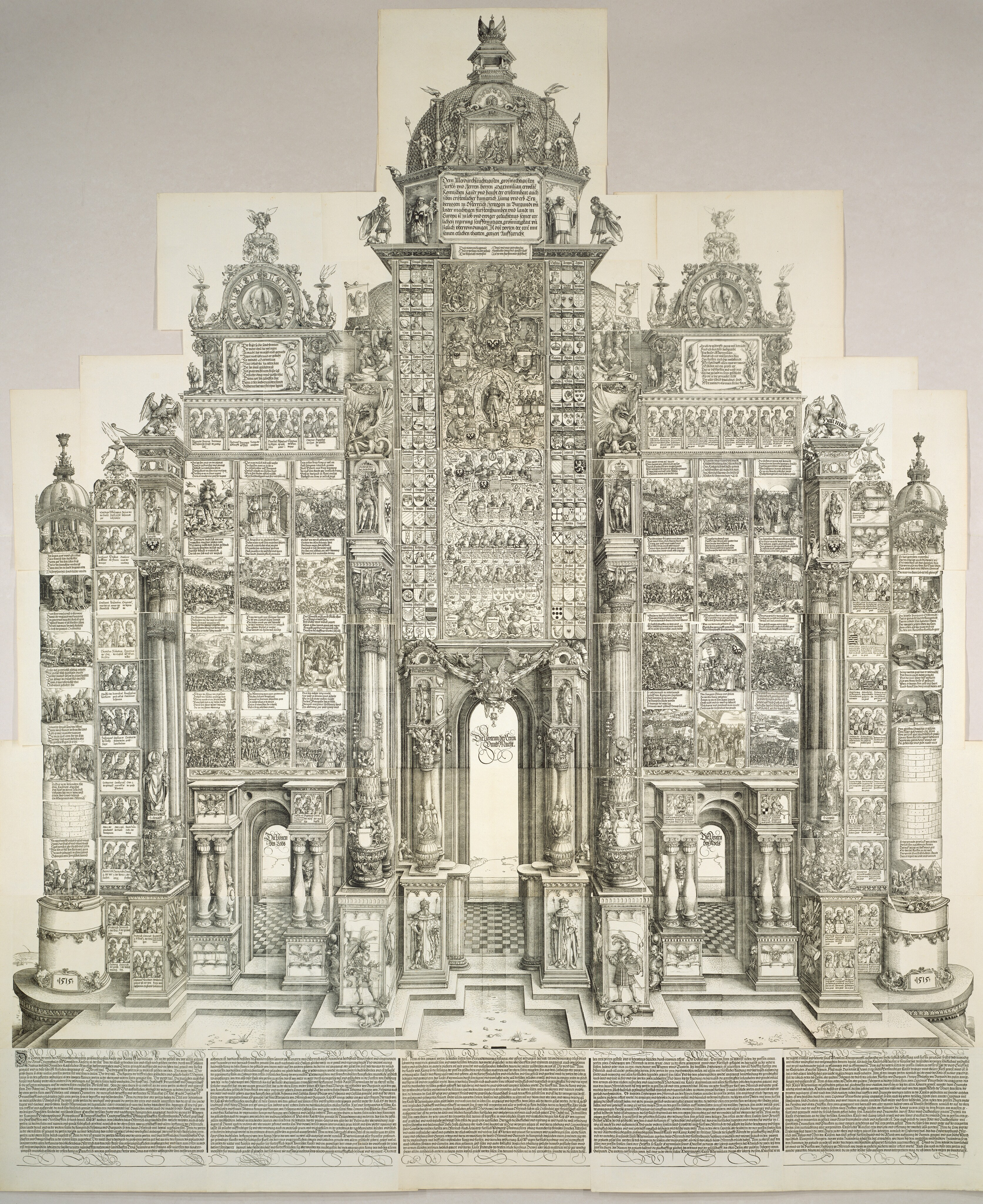
The Triumphal Arch, edition of 1799 with 42 woodcuts and 2 etchings, 354 × 298.5 cm overall (National Gallery of Art, Washington, D.C., Inv. 76935).

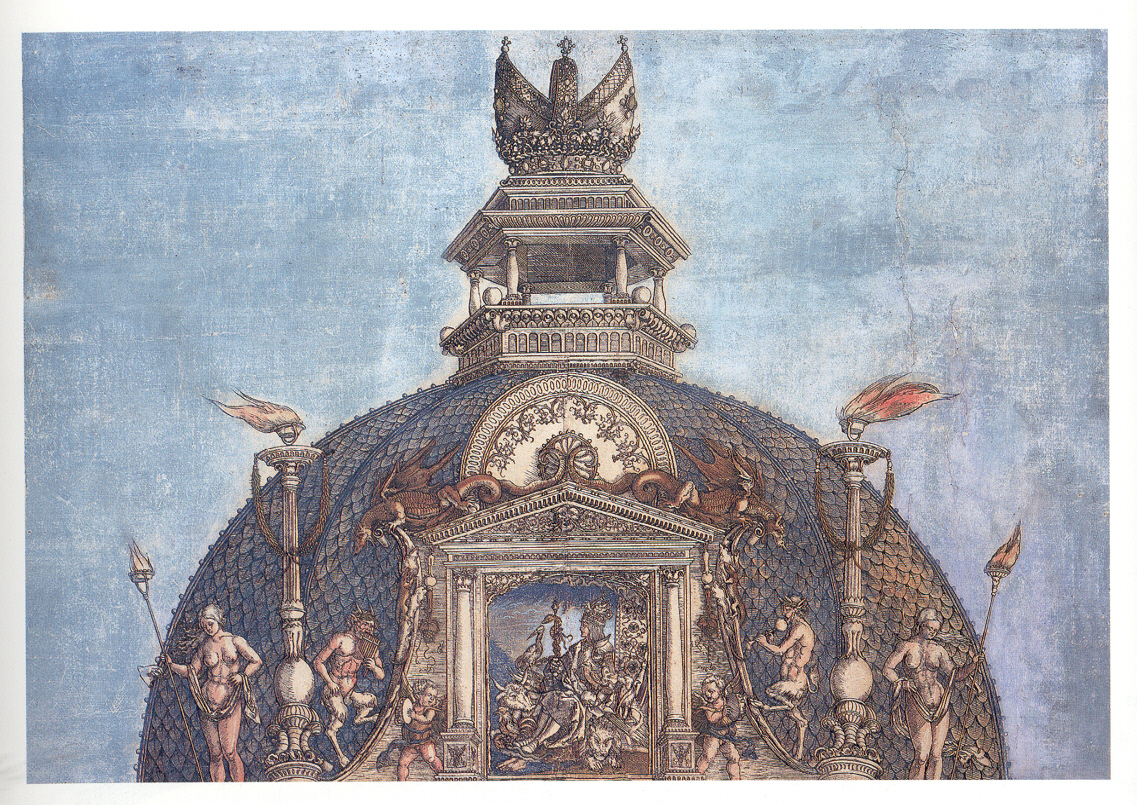
Detail of pinnacle from a coloured impression in Brunswick.

The Triumphal Arch (also known as the Arch of Maximilian I, German: Ehrenpforte Maximilians I.) is a 16th-century monumental woodcut print commissioned by the Holy Roman Emperor Maximilian I. The composite image was printed on 36 large sheets of paper from 195 separate wood blocks. At 295 × 357 centimetres (9 ft 8 in × 11 ft 9 in), it is one of the largest prints ever produced and was intended to be pasted to walls in city halls or the palaces of princes. It is a part of a series of three huge prints created for Maximilian, the others being a Triumphal Procession (1516–1518, 137 woodcut panels, 54 metres (177 ft) long) which is led by a Large Triumphal Carriage (1522, 8 woodcut panels, 8 × 1.5 feet (244 × 46 cm)); only the Arch was completed in Maximilian's lifetime and distributed as propaganda, as he intended. Together, this series has been described by art historian Hyatt Mayor as "Maximilian's program of paper grandeur". They stand alongside two published biographical allegories in verse, the Theuerdank and Weisskunig, heavily illustrated with woodcuts.

Very large multi-sheet prints designed to decorate walls were a feature of the early 16th century, although their use in this way means their survival rate is exceptionally low. The prints were intended to be hand-colored, but only two sets of impressions from the first edition survive with contemporary coloring (held in Berlin, Germany and Prague, Czech Republic).

== Design and execution ==
The architectural form of the arch was designed by Tyrolean architect and court painter Jörg Kölderer, and elaborated by Maximilian's court historian and mathematician Johannes Stabius, modelled on the triumphal arches constructed by Roman Emperors in Ancient Rome (although Maximilian's arch was never intended to be constructed in stone). It may have been inspired by a six-panel woodcut View of Venice, a bird's-eye view of Venice, Italy designed by Jacopo de' Barbari and published by the Nuremberg publisher Anton Kolb, both of whom entered the employ of Maximilian from about 1500. Detailed drawings for the woodcuts were created between 1512 and 1515, mainly by Albrecht Dürer and his pupils, Hans Springinklee and Wolf Traut; the flanking round towers are attributed to Albrecht Altdorfer.

The design includes three arches: the central arch is entitled "Honour and Might", the left arch is "Praise", and the right arch is "Nobility". Each arch is illustrated with scenes relating to Maximilian, including a family tree above the central arch which leads back to Clovis I, first King of the Franks, and then the mythical Francia, Sicambria and Troia, flanked by heraldic escutcheons, and 12 historical scenes above each of the two side arches. To the left are busts of emperors and kings, including Julius Caesar and Alexander the Great, and to the right are Maximilian's ancestors. Towers to each side show scenes from Maximilian's private life. Towards the lower right is a line of three shields showing the coats of arms of Stabius, Kölderer and Dürer. Many panels contain a descriptive text, and a long inscription at the bottom describes the whole. The design includes elements of Egyptian hieroglyphs, influenced by Willibald Pirckheimer's 1514 translation of the Hieroglyphica by Roman author Horapollo.

The woodcut was responsible for the Fraktur font.

== Patron ==
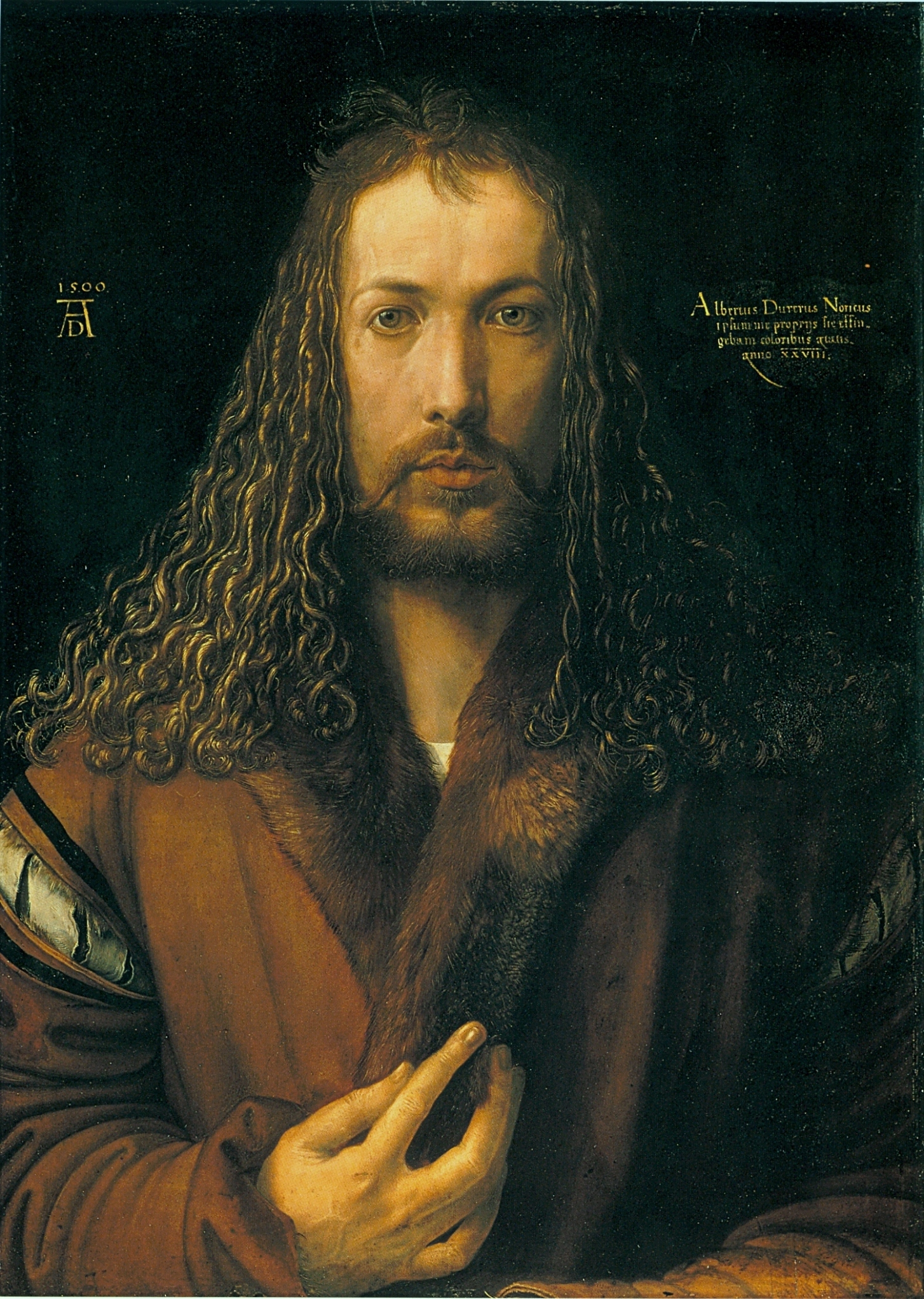
Albrecht Dürer, German painter and printmaker, self-portrait in 1500.

Emperor Maximilian, as patron of the Triumphal Arch, commissioned this almost twelve-foot-tall print. He wanted to commemorate his military conquests, generosity, and nobility. The Triumphal Arch, along with the Triumphal Procession and Large Triumphal Carriage, is one of three very large prints representing Emperor Maximilian I’s triumphs. The illustrations, designed between 1516 and 1518, were largely the work of Hans Burgkmair (German, Augsburg 1473–1531 Augsburg), with contributions by Albrecht Altdorfer (German, Regensburg c. 1480–1538 Regensburg), Hans Springinklee (German, c. 1495–after 1522), Albrecht Dürer (German, Nuremberg 1471–1528 Nuremberg), Leonhard Beck (German, 1480–1542), and Hans Schäufelen (German, Nuremberg c. 1480–c. 1540 Nördlingen). Only the Triumphal Arch was completed before Maximilian's death in 1519. It reflects Maximilian's position as Holy Roman Emperor and links him to the triumphal arches and triumphs of Ancient Rome.

Dürer, a painter, draftsman, and writer, known for his highly elaborate woodcuts designed 192 of the woodblocks. His ambition, talent, and wide-ranged intellect earned him the recognition of some of the most prominent figures like Maximilian I (and successor Charles V). Dürer apprenticed with his father (a goldsmith) and Michael Wolgemut (a painter), who produced woodcuts for written text and publications. Emperor Maximilian I recognized Dürer's creativity and that his success was only going to increase, making him an appropriate choice for such an important project.

== Historical context ==
The earliest and most imposing uses of the triumphal arch motif in Renaissance art begun in 1462 with Leon Battista Alberti’s Basilica of Sant’Andrea in Mantua. In Imperial Rome, triumphal arches were a common way to honor the emperors. In later centuries, triumphal arches inspired imitations worldwide like Arc de Triomphe and Arc du Carrousel in Paris, the Wellington Arch and Marble Arch in London, and the Siegestor in Munich. Freestanding Roman arches also serve as design resources in the Renaissance and later. Primary models either have single-arch or triple-arch form with inscription panels.

The Triumphal Arch was one of the largest prints ever produced (295 × 357 centimeters or 116 × 141 in) and was intended to be distributed as propaganda and to be put on display in magnificent public areas. The pictorial composition of multiple scenes was established by Andrea Mantegna. This technique became the standard for architrave-like designs that depicted triumphs and battles. The display history of this monumental print demonstrates that Maximilian recognized the potential of woodcuts as a vehicle for conversations about politics.

Wall mounting consisted of sealing wax, tacks, or direct adhesion, similar to 15th- and 16th-century paintings. All of the prints for Emperor Maximillian I were intended to be hand-colored. Still, only two sets of the impressions from the first edition were able to survive throughout centuries.

== Iconography and design elements ==
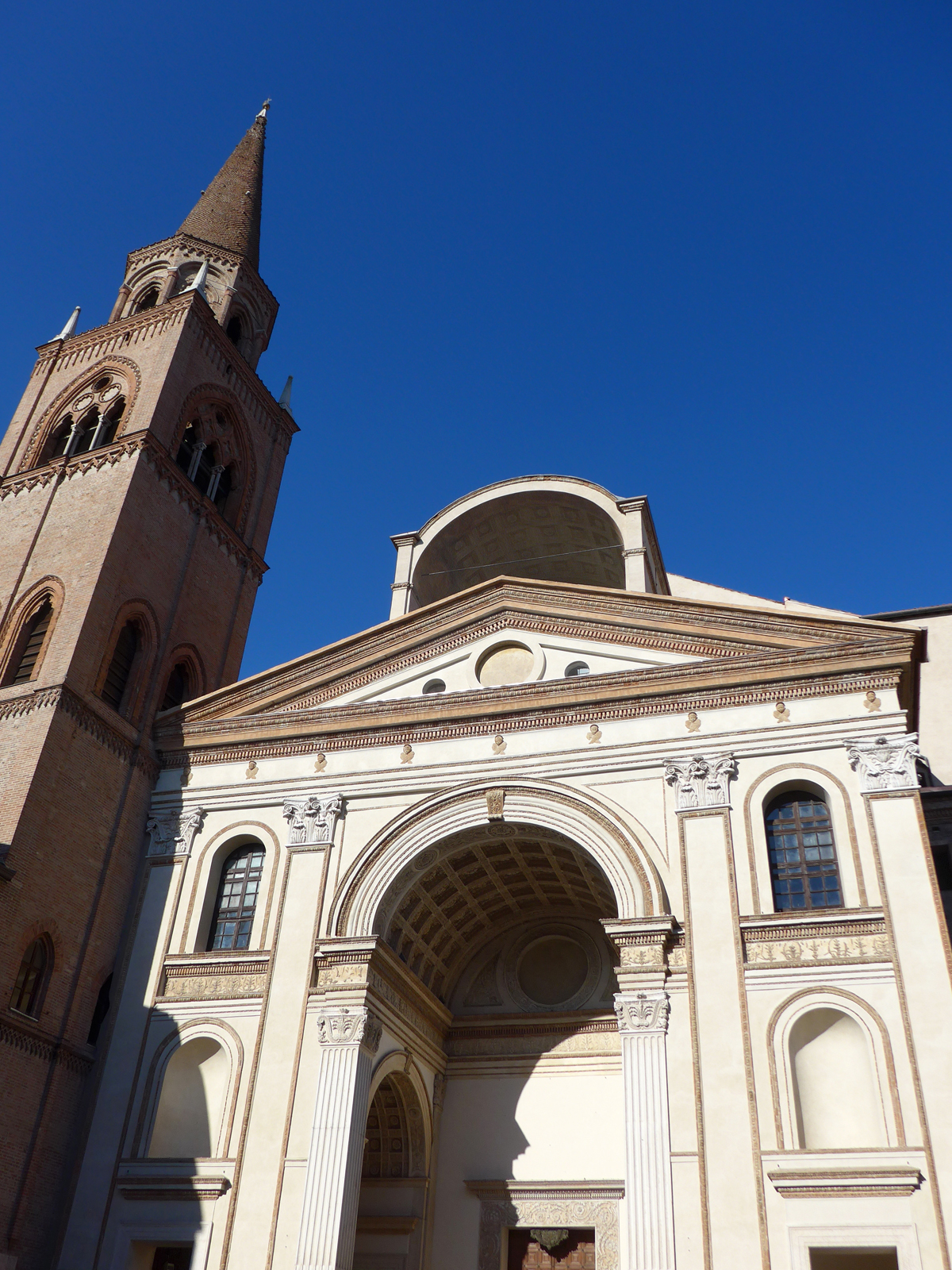
Basilica di Sant'Andrea, Mantua, Italy.

The design includes three arches: the central arch is entitled "Honour and Might", the left arch is "Praise", and the right arch is "Nobility". Each arch is illustrated with scenes relating to Maximilian, including a family tree above the central arch which leads back to Clovis I, first King of the Franks, and then the mythical Francia, Sicambria and Troia, flanked by heraldic escutcheons, and 12 historical scenes above each of the two side arches. Above the center arch, are events that represent Maximilian's past life. Jörg Kölderer, architect and painter, designed the individual scenes. He distributed some of the work to Hans Springinklee, Wolf Traut, and Albrecht Altdorfer.

To the left are busts of emperors and kings, including Julius Caesar and Alexander the Great, and to the right are Maximilian's ancestors. Towers to each side show scenes from Maximilian's private life. Towards the lower right is a line of three shields showing the coats of arms of Stabius, Kölderer, and Dürer. Many panels contain a descriptive text, and a long inscription at the bottom describes the whole. The design includes elements of Egyptian hieroglyphs, influenced by Willibald Pirckheimer's 1514 translation of the Hieroglyphica by Roman author Horapollo.

== Execution ==
The print is dated 1515 on two blocks, indicating when the designs were completed (save for the 24th historical block – intended to show Maximilian's tomb – which remained blank). The print was given by Maximilian as gifts, mostly to the cities and princes of the Holy Roman Empire.

The Triumphal Arch is three meters high, made of 195 woodblocks. Durer worked on the middle gateway (not including the genealogical tree, coats of arms, and cupola), middle columns with ornamental statues, ornamental portions, round tower scene, the historical scenes (2nd, 15th, 22nd, and 23rd), three figures in the genealogical tree, and the busts of six emperors. The cutting of woodblocks was completed between 1515 and 1517 by Hieronymus Andreae (Resch) of Nuremberg. His signature is included on the back of the blocks at Vienna. There were about seven hundred sets of prints in the first edition of 1517–1518. The architectural form of the arch was designed by Tyrolean architect and court painter Jörg Kölderer, and elaborated by Maximilian's court historian and mathematician Johannes Stabius, modelled on the triumphal arches constructed by Roman Emperors in Ancient Rome (although Maximilian's arch was never intended to be constructed in stone). It may have been inspired by a six-panel woodcut View of Venice, a bird's-eye view of Venice designed by Jacopo de' Barbari and published by the Nuremberg publisher Anton Kolb, both of whom entered the employ of Maximilian from about 1500.

== Distribution ==
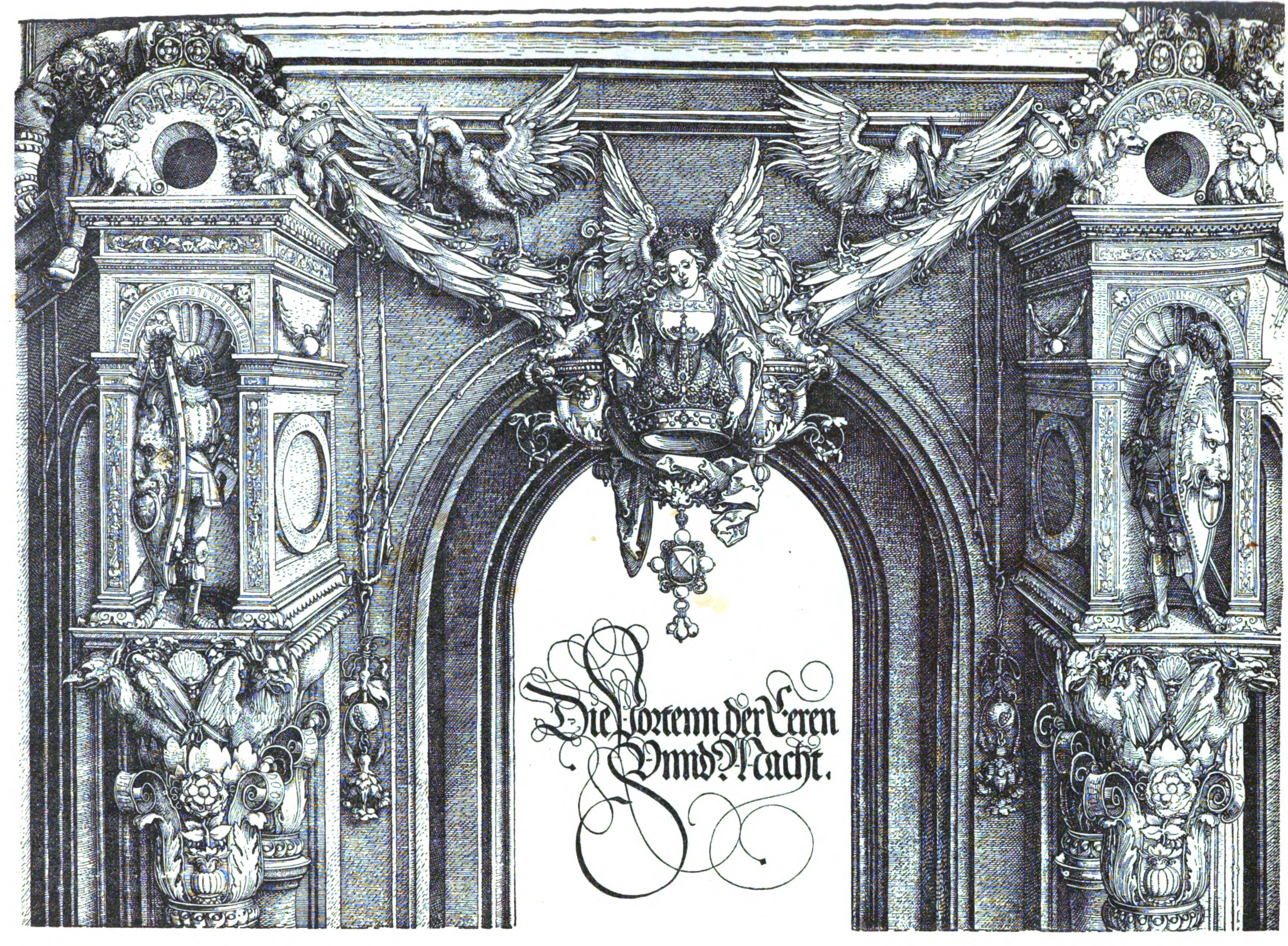
Detail of Triumphal Arch.

Examples of the first edition include those in the print rooms at the British Museum in London, the Albertina in Vienna, and museums in Berlin, Copenhagen, Prague, and elsewhere.

The second edition of about 300 was authorized by Archduke Ferdinand (Maximilian's grandson and later Holy Roman Emperor) in 1526–28, and a third edition by Archduke Charles (Ferdinand's son) in 1559. Separate editions of just the scenes from Maximilian's life were printed, the first in 1520 just after his death. A separate print of the tomb, itself another major piece of Habsburg propagandizing, was created, to be pasted over the empty 24th historical panel. A fourth edition was published by Adam Bartsch in Vienna in 1799, with many of the block showing considerable wear - several missing blocks were replaced by etchings by Bartsch (including the Battle of Utrecht, Maximilian's coronation, and the First Congress of Vienna; the 24th panel shows a new image of the Battle of Pavia). A fifth edition followed in 1886.

171 of the 195 original woodblocks survive and are held by the Albertina, Vienna.

== See also ==
- List of engravings by Albrecht Dürer
- List of woodcuts by Albrecht Dürer
