= Triumphal Procession =

Series of woodcut prints commissioned by Emperor Maximilian I

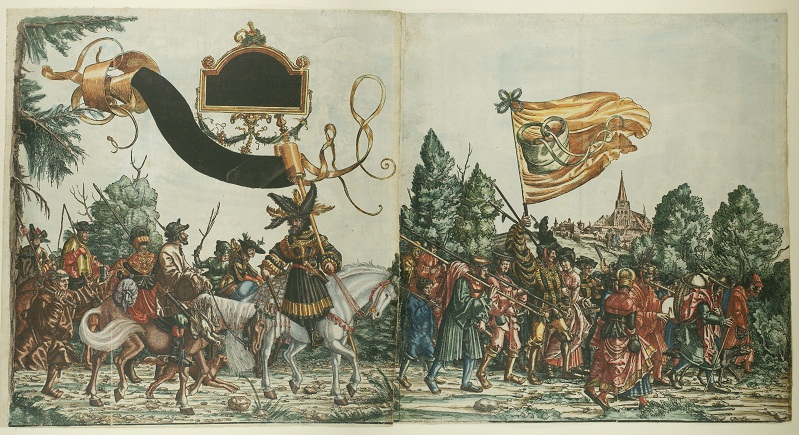
Coloured impression of blocks 132 (left),133-4 (right), showing the baggage-train, by Albrecht Altdorfer

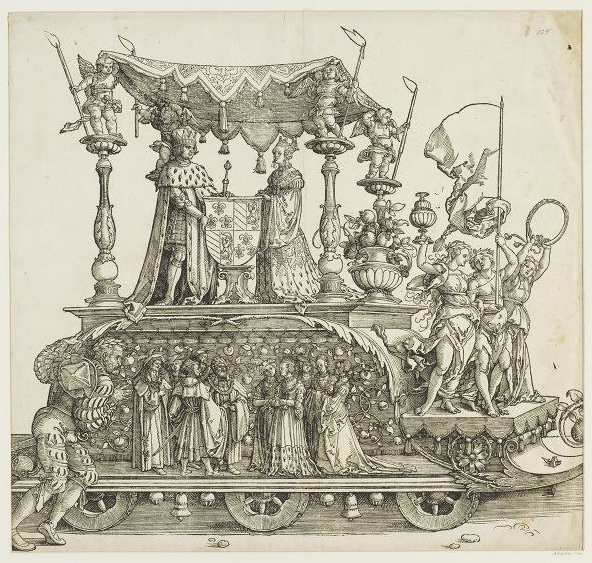
One of the floats bearing Maximilian's ancestors

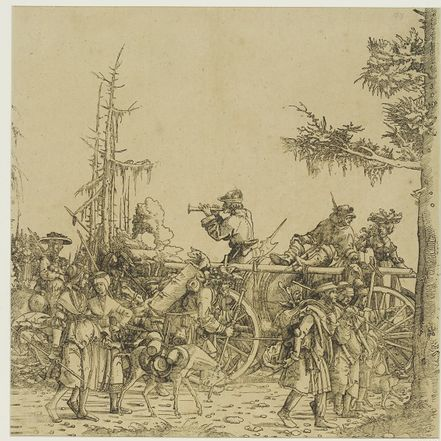
Part of the baggage train

The Triumphal Procession (in German, Triumphzug) or Triumphs of Maximilian is a monumental 16th-century series of woodcut prints by several artists, commissioned by the Holy Roman Emperor Maximilian I. The composite image was printed from over 130 separate wood blocks; a total of 139 are known. Approximately 54 metres (177 ft) long, it is one of the largest prints ever produced. It was designed to be pasted to the walls in city halls or the palaces of princes to create a decorative frieze, an expression of the Emperor's power and magnificence: a pictorial form of the contemporaneous royal entry, which like many Renaissance entries looked back to the Roman triumph. Maximilian's papers show that he intended the procession to "grace the walls of council chambers and great halls of the empire, proclaiming for posterity the noble aims of their erstwhile ruler". It was one of several works of propaganda in literary and print form commissioned by Maximilian, who was always drastically short of money, and lacked the funds to actually stage such a ceremony, unlike his Habsburg descendants. It could also be bound as a book, and it is copies treated this way which have survived, as well as those from later reprints.

== Other huge prints commissioned for Maximililian ==
The work is one of three huge prints created for Maximilian. The other two projects were largely designed by Albrecht Dürer: a Triumphal Arch (1512-5, 192 woodcut panels, 10 feet (3.0 m) high and 12 feet (3.7 m) wide), and a Large Triumphal Carriage (1522, 8 woodcut panels, 1.5 feet (0.46 m) high 8 feet (2.4 m) long) which was originally intended to form part of the Triumphal Procession but was published separately by Dürer in 1522. These monumental projects reflect Maximilian's position as Holy Roman Emperor, and link him to the triumphal arches and triumphs of Ancient Rome. Only the Triumphal Arch was completed before Maximilian's death in 1519, and distributed as Imperial propaganda as he intended. Other projects were the verse and print books Theuerdank, an allegorical chivalrous romance account of Maximilian's courtship of Mary of Burgundy, and Der Weisskunig.

== Design programme and incomplete status at Maximilian's death ==
The programme for the Triumphal Procession was worked out by Maximilian and Johannes Stabius in 1512, and dictated to Maximilian's secretary Marx Treitsaurwein. Hans Burgkmair designed much of the Triumphal Procession, starting in about 1512 and contributing designs for 67 woodblocks. Other contributions were made by Albrecht Altdorfer (38 blocks), Hans Springinklee (20), Leonhard Beck (7), Hans Schäufelein (2), Wolf Huber (2), and Albrecht Dürer (2). The designs were cut from 1516 to 1519 by a large team of block-cutters led by Jost de Negker, including Hieronymus Andreae, Cornelis Liefrinck and Willem Liefrinck. The work was not completed by Maximilian's death in 1519 and the project stalled with 139 blocks completed; a large number of portraits of courtiers and German princes were among the casualties, and were never made. Dürer ceased to receive the annual pension of 100 florins paid under Maximilian, and he published his Large Triumphal Carriage separately in 1522 (in the description below it is restored in its intended place as block 122 a-g); a smaller equivalent was substituted.

== Subjects of individual woodblocks ==
The subjects on the individual woodblocks forming the procession include: a naked herald riding a griffin at the start of the work (block 1), then a large blank frame pulled by two horses (intended to be carved with the title), followed by a large collection of musicians, many in carts drawn by exotic animals (3-4, 17-26, 77-78 etc.), drummers, falconers and huntsmen accompanied by their prey (5-14), two carts containing jesters and fools (27-30), fencers, tournament fighters and jousters (33-56), 29 groups of standard bearers on horseback carrying the flags of Maximilian's many titles and territories (57-88), a cart for Maximilian's wedding (89-90), carriages with depictions of Maximilian's military victories (91-102), a cart for the wedding of Maximilian's son Philip I of Castile to Joanna of Castile (105), carriages with Maximilians's ancestors (106-110), soldiers and prisoners of war, and finally Dürer's 8-block triumphal carriage containing Maximilian himself drawn by twelve horses (122 a-g). After the carriage come representatives from foreign peoples, including exotic people from Calicut with an elephant (129), American Indians (130), soldiers, and then the baggage-train (132-137), shown descending from a hilly alpine landscape. The last block (137) shows a wagon laden with cooking-pots and a man carrying rods with shoes hanging from them. The procession is an important documentary source for the details of the musical instruments and the weapons and armour of the period.

== Editions from 1526 to 1884 ==
A first edition of 137 blocks running to 200 copies was published in 1526, on the order of Maximilian's grandson Archduke Ferdinand. A second edition of 135 blocks was printed in 1777, with further editions published by Adam Bartsch and then in 1883-4 by Franz Schestag. The British Museum has a composite set of 137 woodcuts drawn from three different editions, 97 from the 1526 edition, 36 from 1777, and 4 from 1796, with the text that accompanied the 1796 edition.

== Surviving manuscript and woodblocks ==
The manuscript text has survived in Vienna, and 135 of the 139 woodblocks are in the Albertina in Vienna.

== Similarities with the Triumphs of Maximilian ==
The woodcut series was sometimes hand-coloured, like other prints, but it is not to be confused with a different and much shorter illuminated manuscript Triumphs of Maximilian by Albrecht Altdorfer of 1513-1515 (now Albertina), with many similar scenes, but also many in which soldiers on foot carry banners containing representations of particular campaigns of the Emperor.

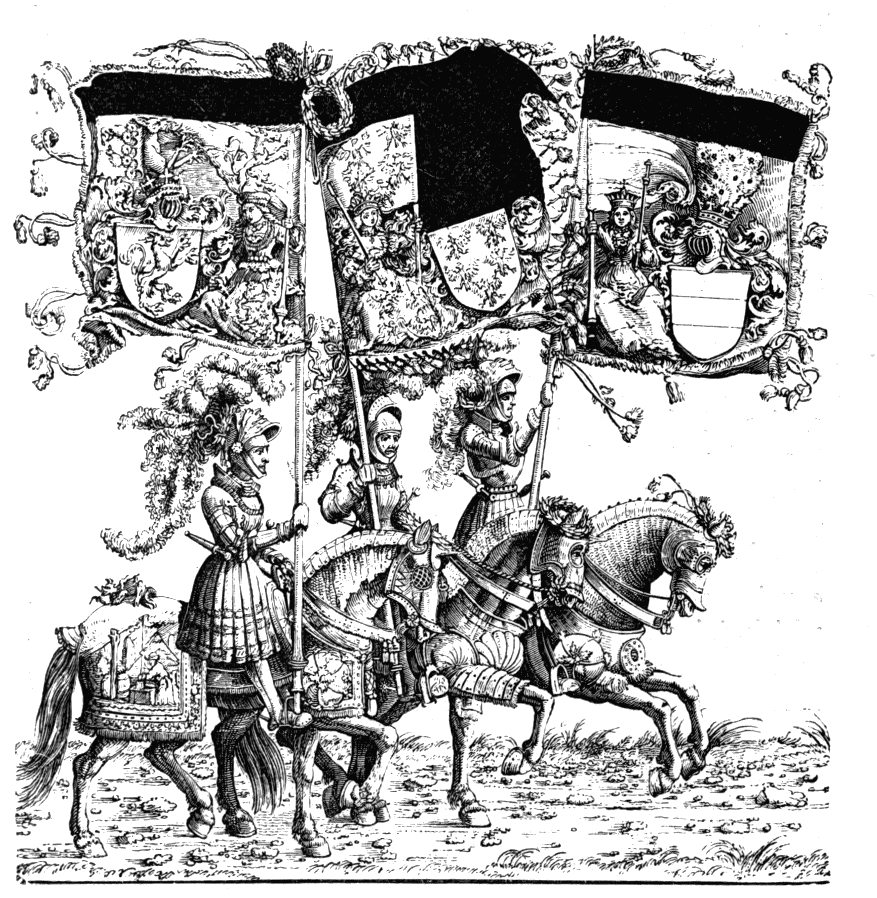
Standard-bearers

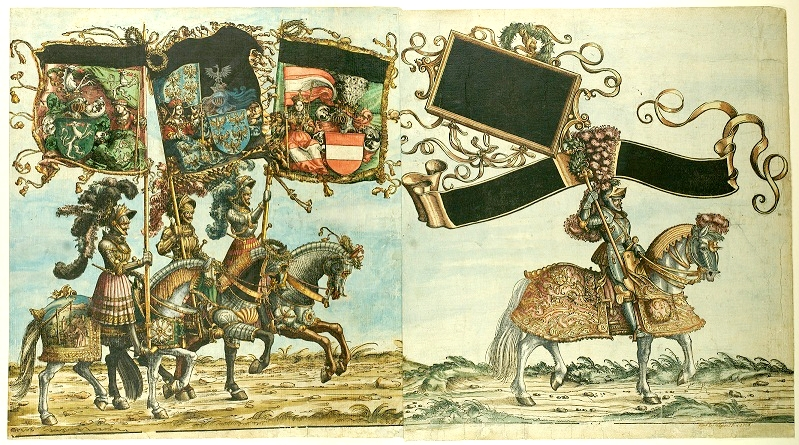

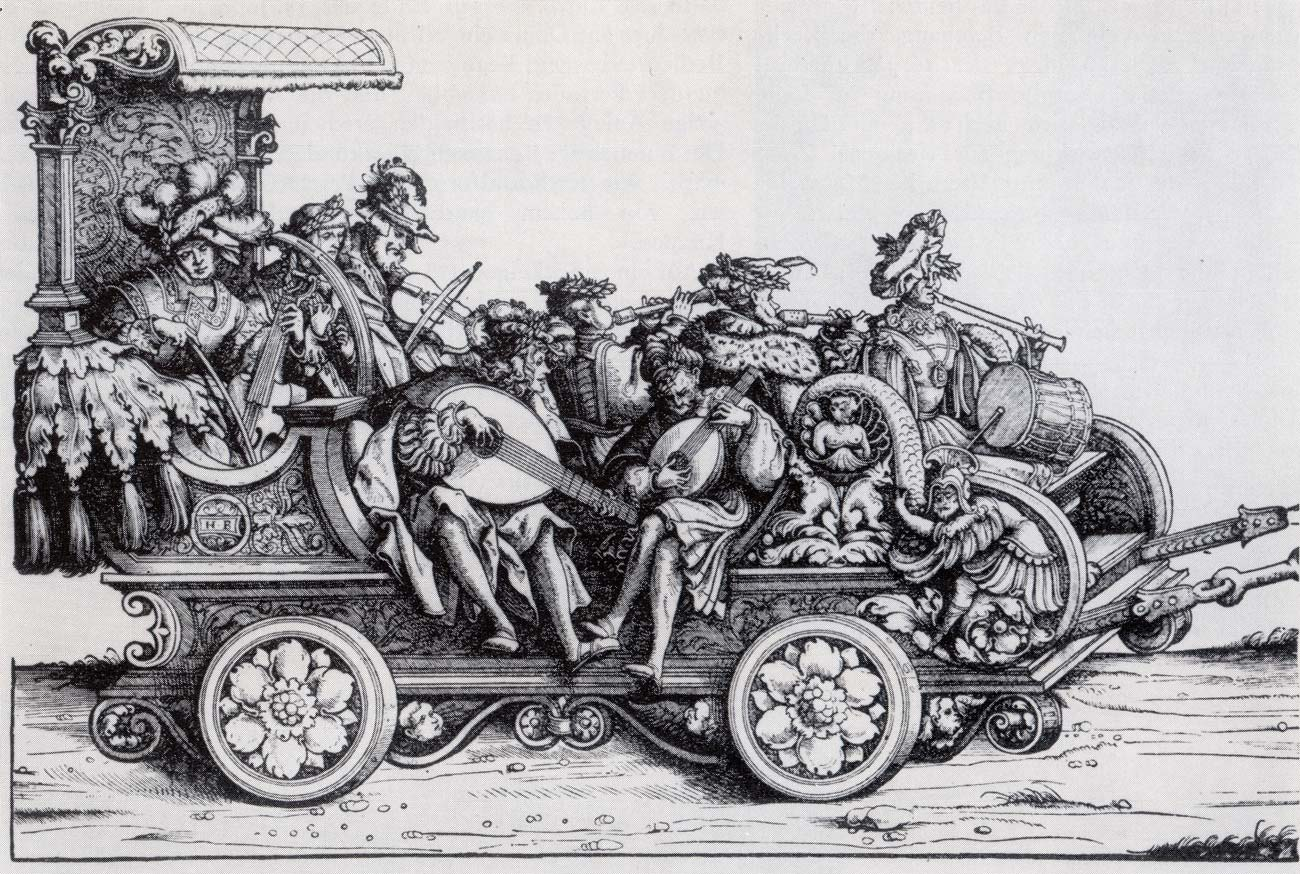
Musicians, by Hans Burgkmair

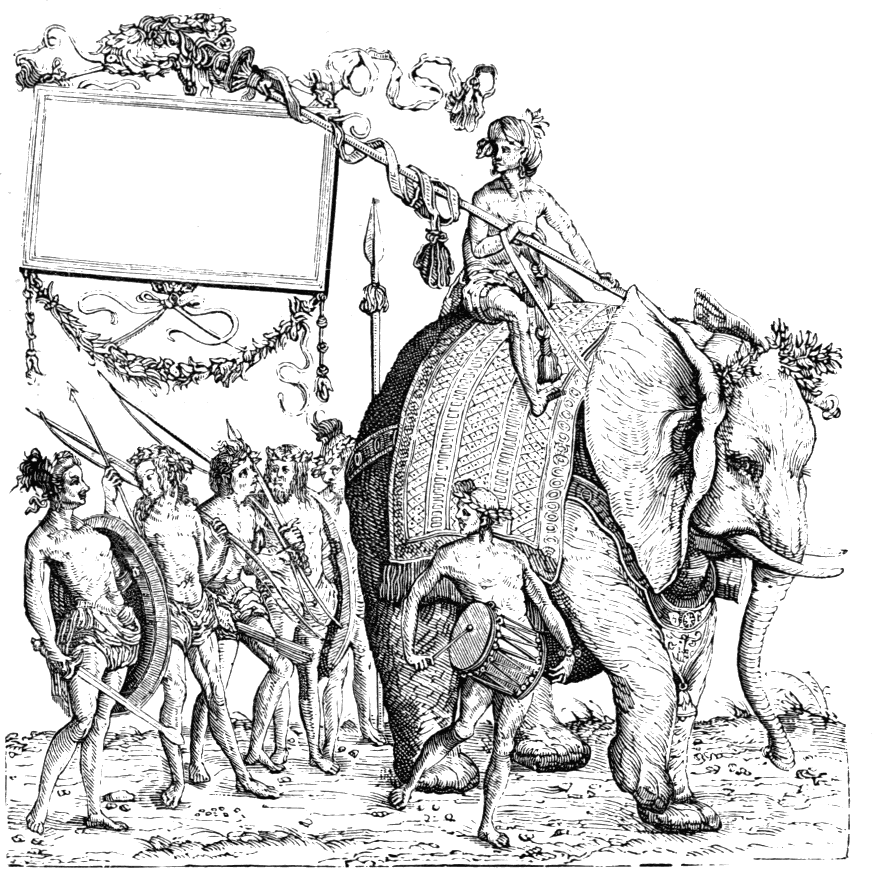
People of Calicut
