= Portrait of Emperor Maximilian I =

1519 painting by Albrecht Dürer

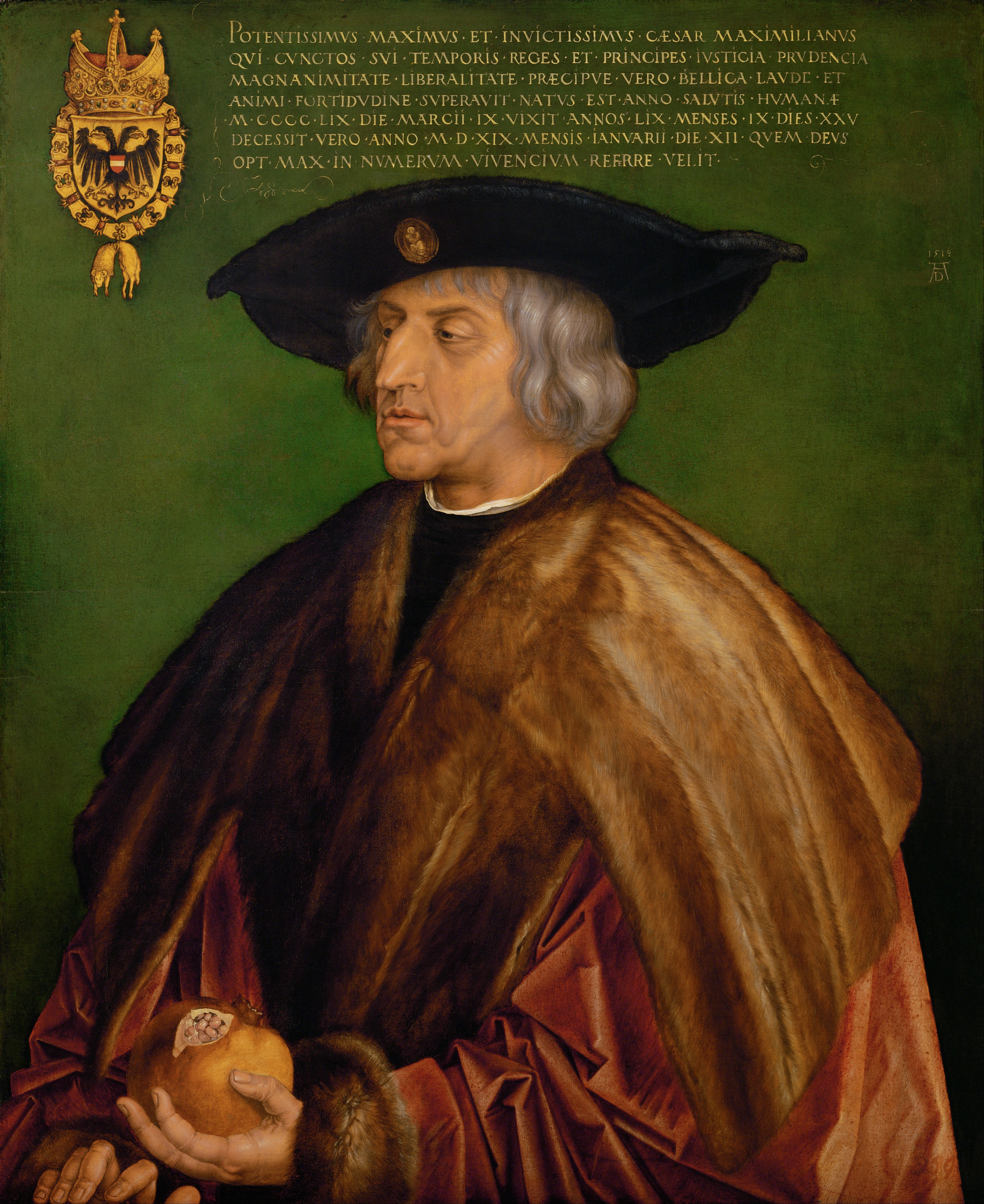
- Artist: Albrecht Dürer
- Year: 1519
- Type: Oil on lime wood
- Dimensions: 74 cm × 62 cm (29 in × 24 in)
- Location: Kunsthistorisches Museum; Vienna

The Portrait of Emperor Maximilian I is an oil painting by Albrecht Dürer, dating to 1519 and now in the Kunsthistorisches Museum in Vienna, Austria. It portrays Maximilian I, Holy Roman Emperor.

Dürer had a portrait sitting with the emperor in Augsburg in 1518, making the drawing now in the Albertina, Vienna, from which he later produced two paintings and a woodcut. He varies the clothes slightly in each.

== History ==
Artist and subject first met in the spring of 1512 when the newly elected emperor Maximilian I of Habsburg stayed in Dürer's city of Nuremberg, where he got acquainted with the artist. As part of Maximililian's considerable programme of propaganda using printmaking, the artist was commissioned to make the huge multi-sheet Triumphal Arch woodcut to celebrate the emperor and his house, for which he was rewarded with 100 florins annually. Copies of the sheets were sent to cities around the empire, to be pasted to walls in palaces and public buildings.

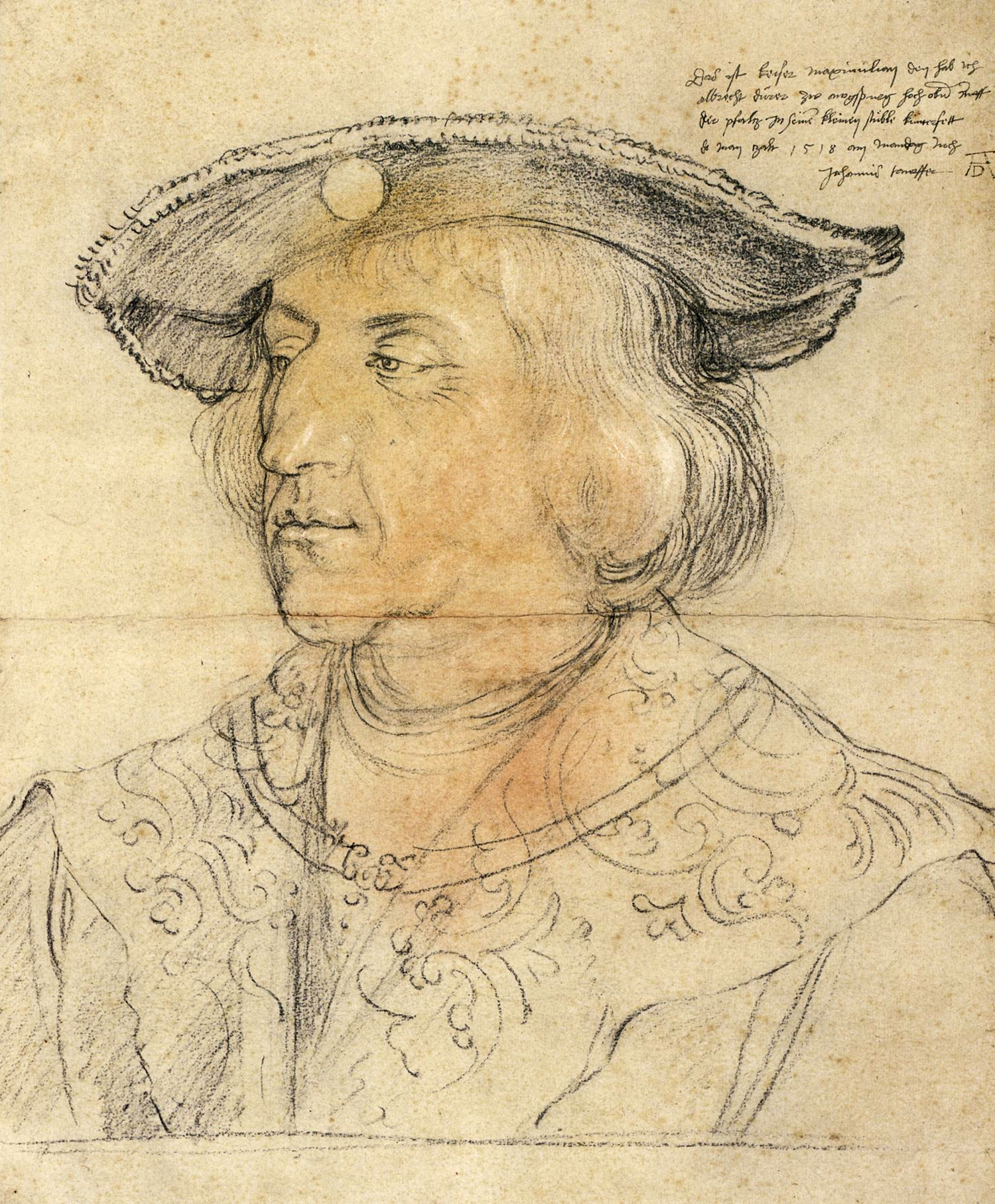
The preparatory drawing.

In 1518, during the Diet of Augsburg, Maximilian called Dürer to portray him. The artist met the emperor in the castle and made a pencil drawing of him, from which he later painted the panel portrait, and also his woodcut portrait. On the drawing's margin, he noted: "Is the emperor Maximilian that I Albrecht Dürer portrayed in Augsburg, up in the high palace, in his small room, Monday 28 June 1518".

The woodcut was perhaps made some time shortly after this. Unlike most of Dürer's woodblock prints, it does not include the artist's monogram.

The oil panel was completed when the emperor had already died, with some variants from the initial drawing. The latter is now in the Albertina, Vienna.

== Description ==
The emperor is portrayed in a three-quarters view on a green background. The arms lie on an unseen parapet coinciding with the lower boundary of the painting, a feature of portraits in Early Netherlandish painting. His left hand holds a large pomegranate (his personal symbol), a symbol of cohesion in diversity and thus of the Holy Roman Empire (the grains representing his subjects).

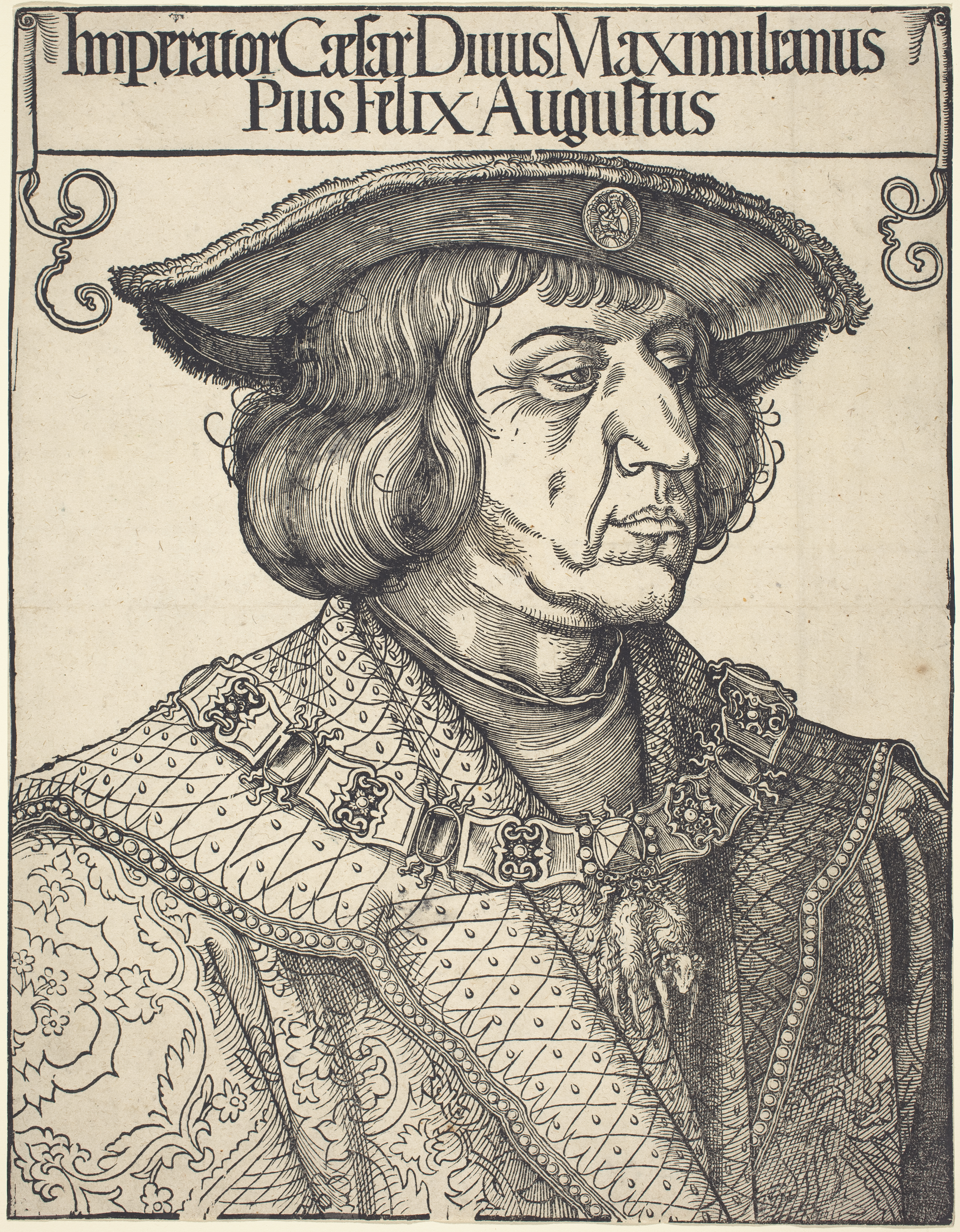
Dürer's woodcut portrait, c. 1518. The image is reversed as a result of the printmaking process.

According to Stabius's explanation on the Arch of Honour, the symbolism behind the pomegranate is like this, "although a pomegranate's exterior is neither very beautiful nor endowed with a pleasant scent, it is sweet on the inside and is filled with a great many well-shaped seeds. Likewise the Emperor is endowed with many hidden qualities which became more and more apparent each day and continue to bear fruit."

Maximilian wears a gown with a very wide fur collar and a broad-brimmed dark hat, with a brooch in the center. Grey hair crowns his aging but still aristocratic face (Maximilian was 59 at the time).

In the upper left is the Habsburg coat of arms and Golden Fleece chain, near a long inscription in capital characters which gives the titles and the deeds of the emperor.

POTENTISSIMVS. MAXIMVS. ET. INVICTISSIMVS. CAESAR. MAXIMILIANVS/ QVI. CVNCTOS. SVI. TEMPORIS. REGES. ET. PRINCIPES. IVSTICIA. PRVDENCIA/ MAGNANIMITATE. LIBERALITATE PRAECIPVE. VERO. BELLICA. LAVDE. ET/ ANIMI. FORTITVDINE. SVPERAVIT. NATVS. EST. ANNO. SALVTIS. HVMANAE./ M.CCCC. LIX. DIE. MARCII. IX. VIXIT. ANNOS. LIX. MENSES. IX. DIES. XXV/ DECESSIT. VERO. ANNO. M.D.XIX. MENSIS. IANVARII. DIE. XII. QVEM. DEVS/ OPT. MAX. IN. NVMERVM. VIVENCIVM. REFERRE. VELIT

The woodcut has the inscription "Imperator Caesar Divus Maximilianus Pius Felix Augustus", a grandiose classicizing bundle of epithets and titles, not generally used for the emperor in other contexts. It is a reversed version of the image, a natural result of cutting the block following the drawing.

== Comparation with related works of Albrecht Dürer ==
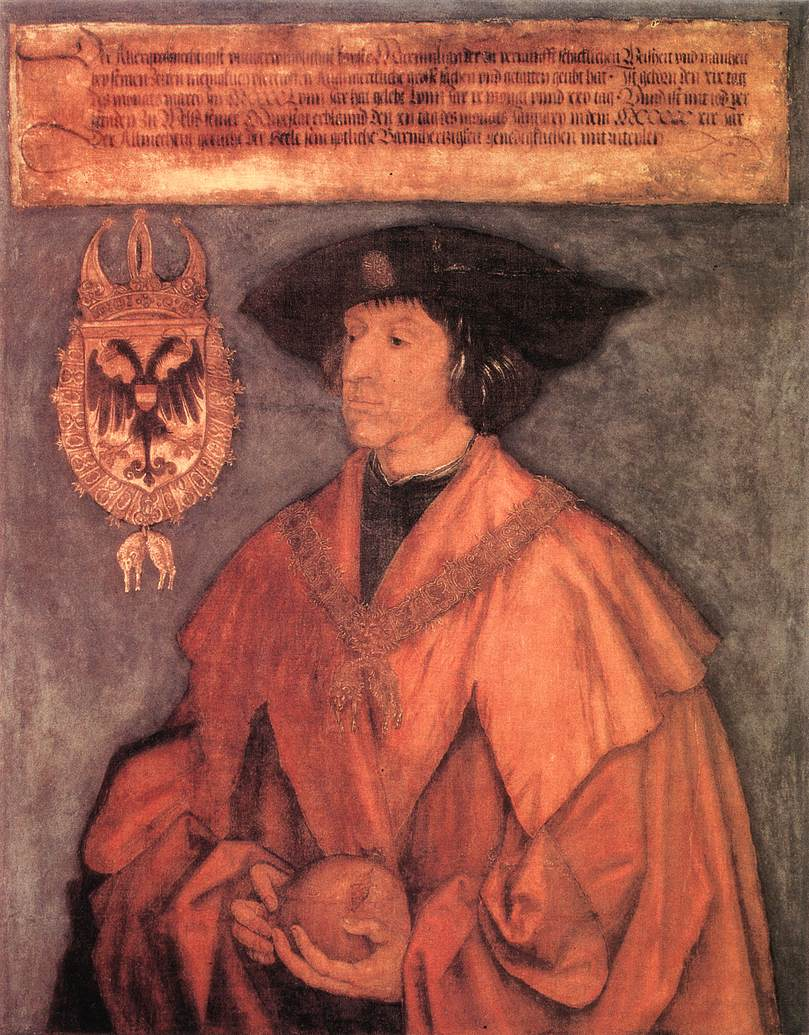
The Nuremberg painting

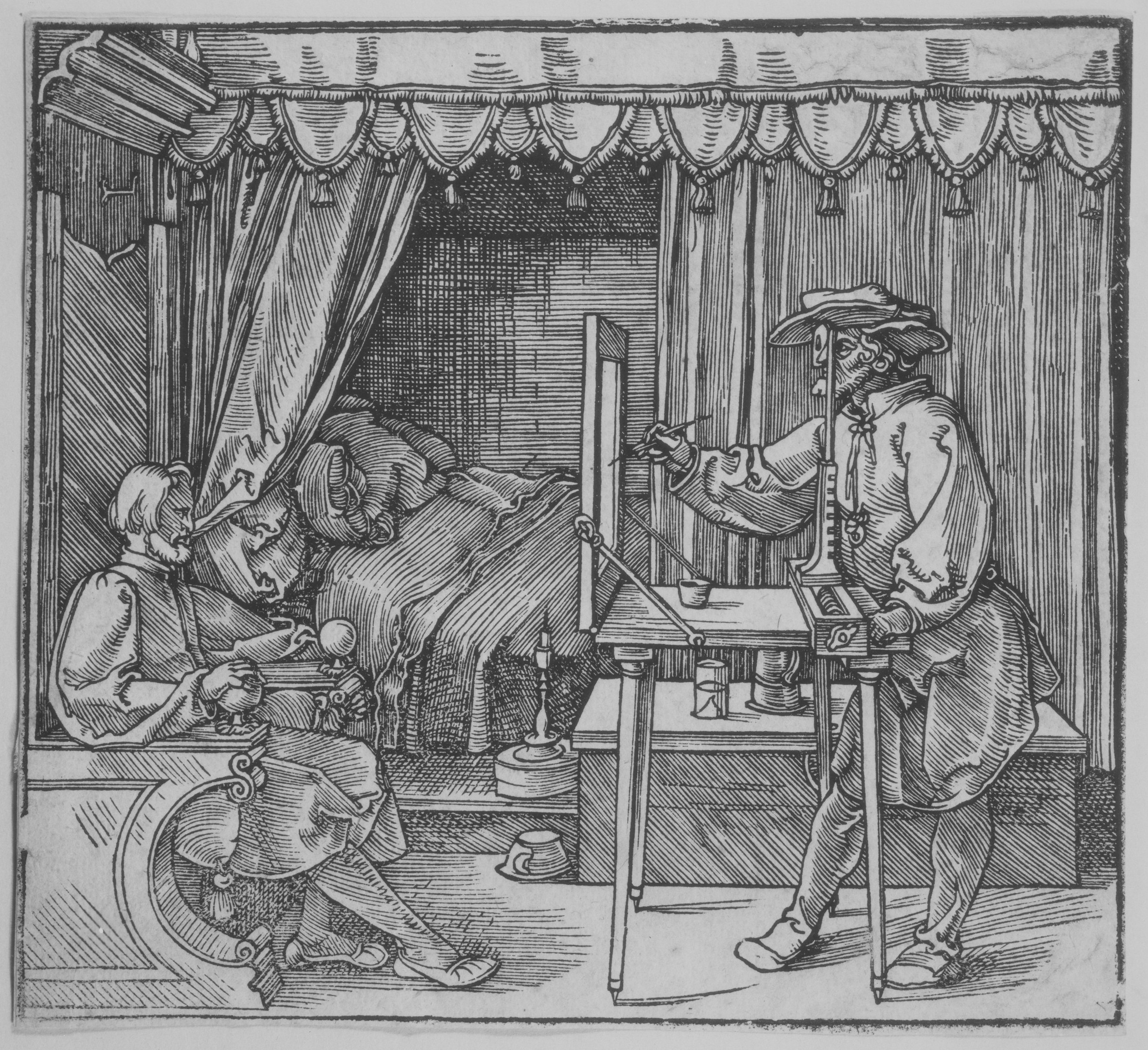
The draughtsman drawing a portrait. MET MM8092.

Katherine Crawford Luber compares the more famous Vienna painting, likely a commission from Maximilian himself, with the Nuremberg version, possibly a processional banner created for the coronation of Charles V. The Nuremberg shows a younger Maximilian with more emphasized symbols of Office and Rule (whereas the Vienna painting does not even show the Order of the Golden Fleece). He is presented in half-length with his hands in a hieratic, axial position.

The intimate meeting with Maximilian "high up in the palace in his tiny little cabinet" seemed to leave an impression on Dürer. Luber opines that the woodcut The draughtsman drawing a portrait he produced later reflected this meeting. The man enthroned was cradling an orb just like Maximilian was holding his pomegranate.

Luber writes:

The significance of Dürer’s Maximilian portraits cannot be divined from their surface appearances alone. An understanding of how Dürer made the versions, repeating a single image, but disguising the repetitions, his crucial to interpretation of the portraits. Dürer’s ability to synthesize the representational, political, and anagogical aspects of portraiture in a single series of productions bears further testimony to his creative genius. In this unique group of portraits — drawing, woodcut, and two paintings – equivalence and variation converge within an unchanging structure as Dürer reveals and masters the complex task of Imperial portraiture.

== See also ==
- List of paintings by Albrecht Dürer

== Sources ==
- Costantino Porcu, ed. (2004). Dürer. Milan: Rizzoli.
