= Hans Leonhard Schäufelein =

German painter

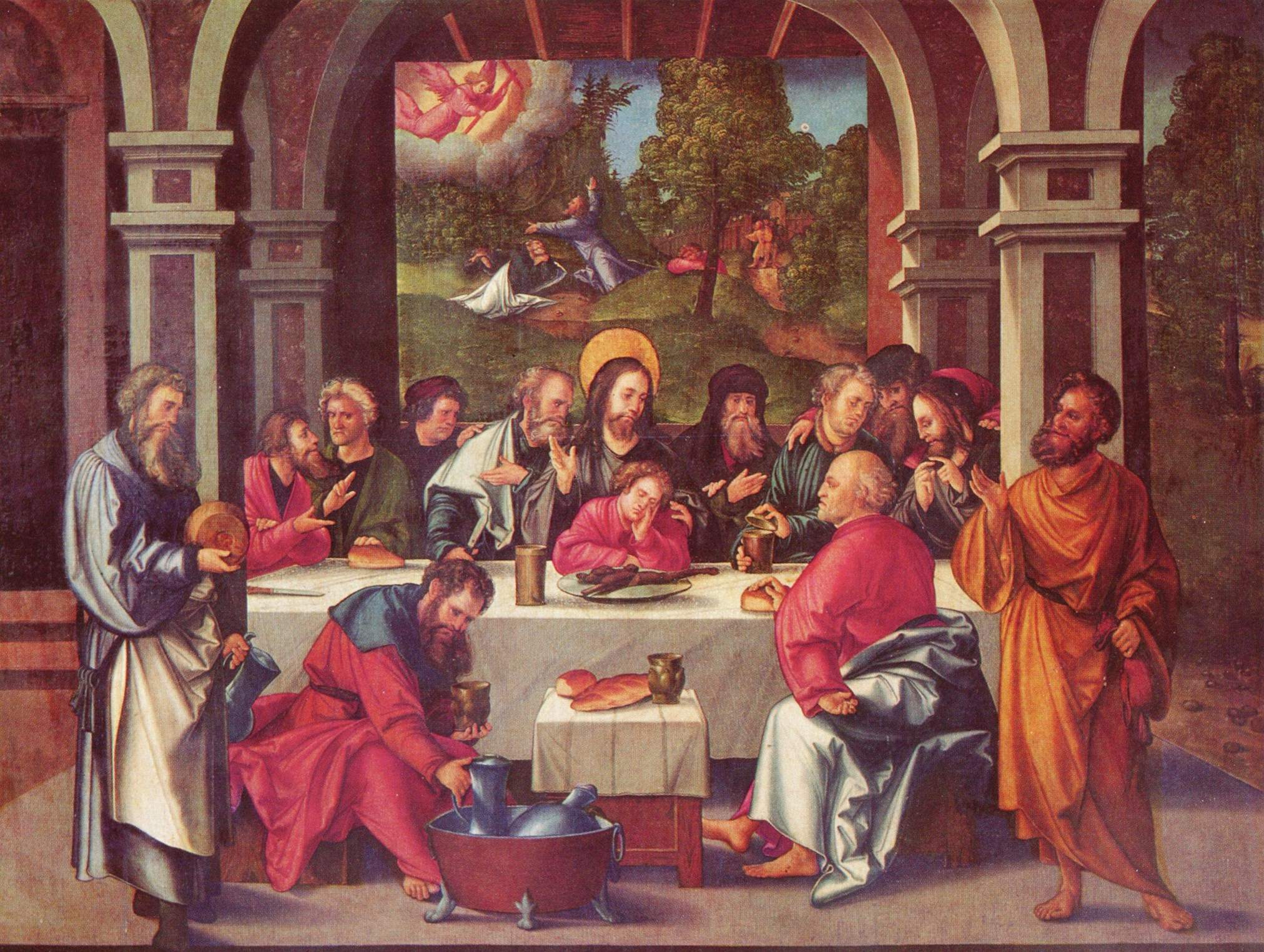
Abendmahl (The Eucharist), Hans Leonhard Schäufelein Abendmahl, 1515, Ulmer Münster.

Hans Leonhard Schäufelein (c. 1480–1540) was a German artist, as a painter and designer of woodcuts.

== Biography ==
He was born in Nuremberg, probably studied under Wohlgemut, and then became the assistant of Dürer, whom he imitated. In 1512 he went to Augsburg and in 1515 removed to Nordlingen.

In 1508–09 Schäufelein worked as a journeyman in Tyrol, painting numerous altarpieces. After 1510 he returned to Augsburg, collaborating with Hans Burgkmair and other artists on major print commissions for Emperor Maximilian I, including woodcuts for the Weisskunig and the Theuerdank. In 1515 he was appointed city painter (Stadtmaler) in Nördlingen, a position he held for the rest of his life. His oeuvre comprises over 50 altarpieces and panel paintings, more than 1,200 woodcuts, and over 80 drawings. His artist's mark was a small shovel (Schaufel), a visual pun on his name.

He is a graceful narrator, and his types, though rarely accurately drawn, are attractive, but he lacks power and depth. Characteristic early paintings are the altarpiece at Ober Sankt Veit near Vienna (1502), "Scenes from the Life of Christ" (Dresden Gallery), and "St. Jerome" (Germanisches Nationalmuseum, Nuremberg).

To his Nordlingen period belong his masterpiece, the so-called "Ziegler Altar" for St. George's Church (1521), part of which is still in the church, part in the museum; "Scenes from the Story of Judith," in the town hall; and the illuminated Psalter for Count von Ottingen, now in the Berlin print room. His most important woodcuts are those for the Theuerdank of Emperor Maximilian.

Schäufelein created a playing card deck about 1535, which is regarded as a highlight in German 16th century playing card production.
