= Leonhard Beck =

German woodcut painter and designer

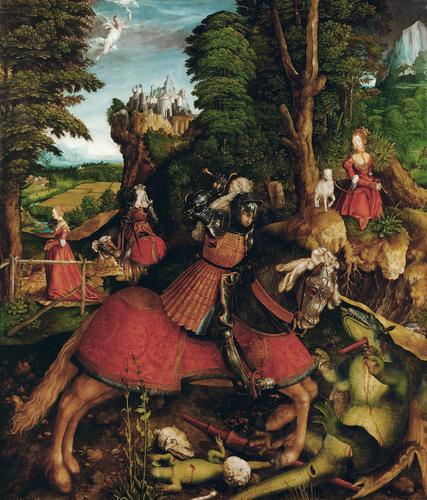
Saint George by Leonhard Beck

Leonhard Beck (c. 1480 – 1542) was a painter and woodcuts designer in Augsburg, Germany. He was the son of Georg Beck, a miniaturist who was active in Augsburg c. 1490–1512/15. Leonhard collaborated with his father on two psalters for the Augsburg monastery in 1495. He later worked as an assistant to Hans Holbein the Elder, contributing to an altarpiece in 1500–1501, which is now housed in the Städel museum in Frankfurt am Main.

His most notable work emerged during his collaboration with Emperor Maximilian I's artistic team, which produced various self-promotional projects in woodcut. Beck served as the primary designer for the extensively illustrated poem,Theuerdank (1517), creating 77 of the 118 woodcuts. He made extensive revisions for the second edition in 1519, as demanded by Maximilian, although his style often clashed jarringly with that of the more skilled artists whose work he was modifying. He designed 126 blocks for Der Weisskunig and 7 for the Triumphal Procession. He also painted and drew numerous portraits, mainly for book illustrations, and created woodcut designs.

Beck is also known for a compilation of 123 woodcuts made by him entitled the Genealogy of the House of Habsburg (or, in French, Images de Saints et Saintes issus de la famille de l'empereur Maximilien I). The work was commissioned by Maximilian I. The intention of the commission was to show saintly members of Maximilian's family. Some of the images show saints connected to the Abbey of Maubeuge that received a copy of the set.
