= Weisskunig =

16th century illustrated book

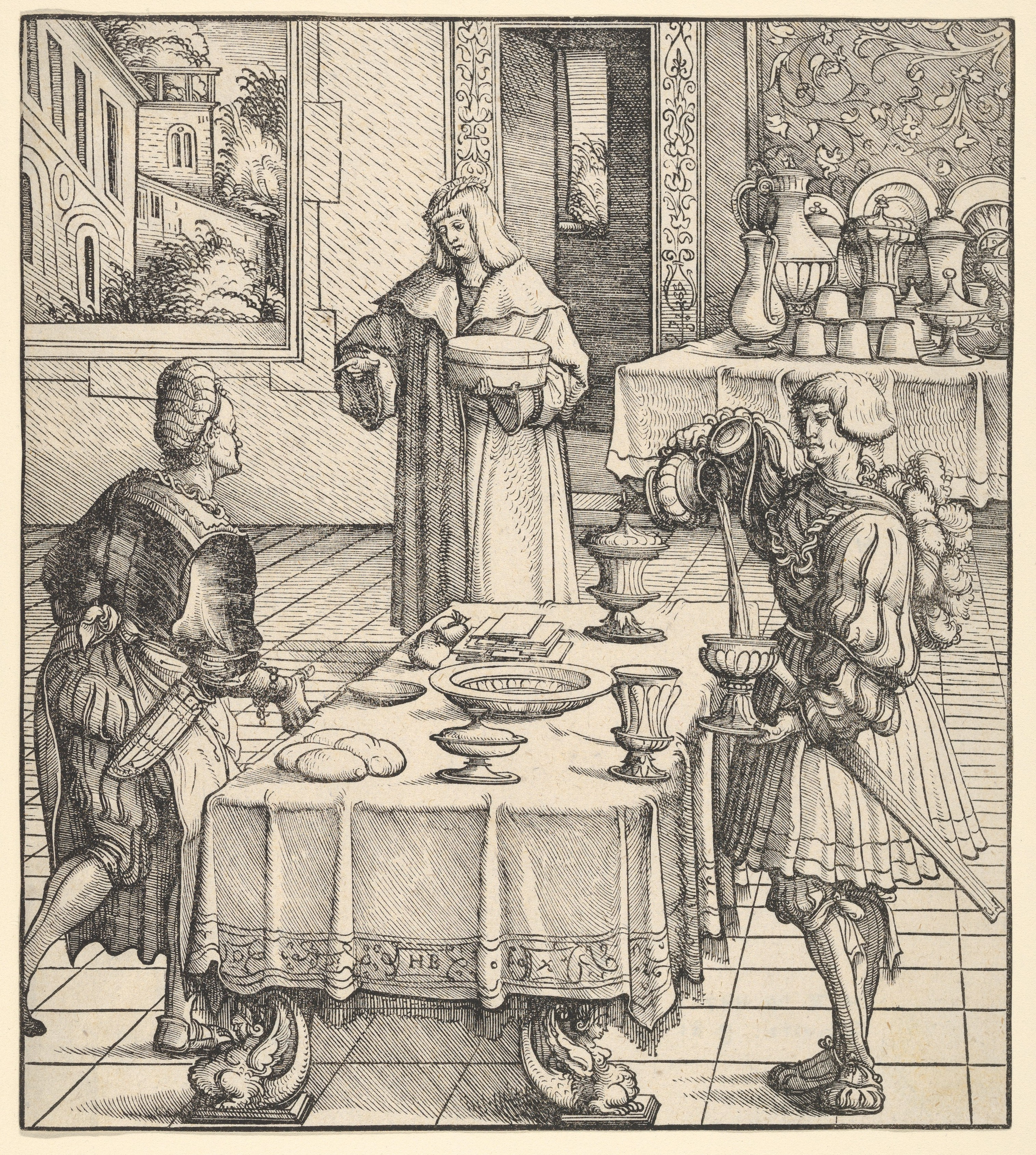
The White King Learning to Conduct a Kitchen, woodcut by Hans Burgkmair

Der Weisskunig or The White King is a chivalric novel and thinly disguised biography of the Holy Roman Emperor, Maximilian I, (1486–1519) written in German by Maximilian and his secretary between 1505 and 1516. Although not explicitly identified as such in the book, Maximilian appears as the "young" White King, with his father Frederick III represented as the "old" White King.

The book is now mainly remembered for the 251 woodcut illustrations, made in Augsburg between 1514 and 1516, the principal artists for which were Hans Burgkmair and Leonhard Beck. The work was never completed, and the full published edition did not appear until 1775.

== Background ==
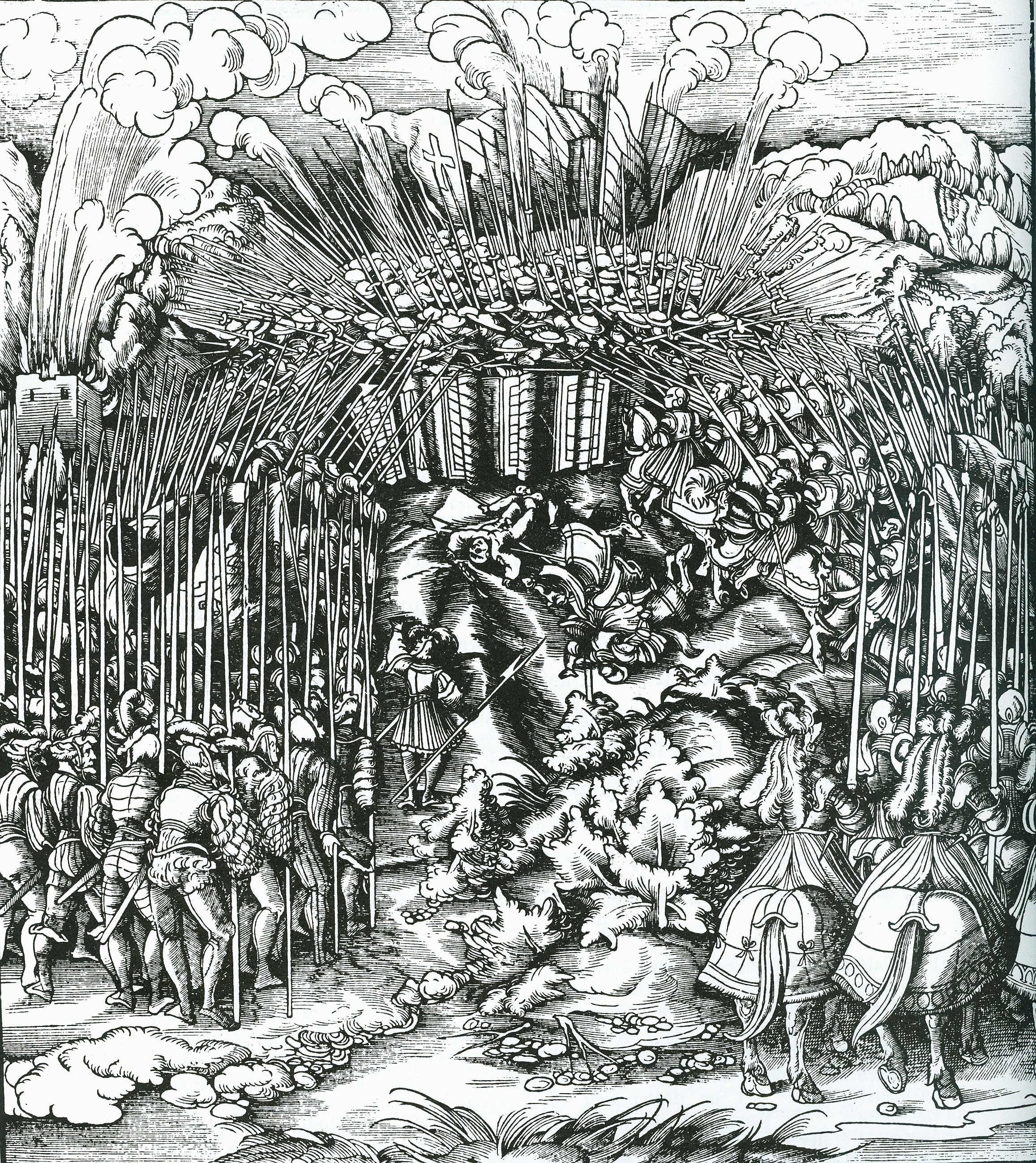
One of many battle scenes in the illustrations

Maximilian I, and his father Frederick III, were part of what was to become a long line of Holy Roman Emperors from the House of Habsburg. Maximilian was elected King of the Romans in 1486 and succeeded his father on his death in 1493.

During his reign Maximilian commissioned a number of humanist scholars and artists to assist him in completing a series of projects, in different art forms, intended to glorify for posterity his life and deeds and those of his Habsburg ancestors. He referred to these projects as Gedechtnus ("memorial"), and included a series of stylised autobiographical works, of which Der Weisskunig was one, the others being the poems Freydal and Theuerdank.

== Composition and publication ==
Der Weisskunig, which was never completed, is a prose work written in German by Maximilian's secretary, Marx Treitzsauerwein, although sections were dictated to him by Maximilian himself. Treitzsauerwein has been described as Maximilian's "ghostwriter". It was composed between 1505 and 1516. After Maximilian's death in 1519, his grandson, Ferdinand, commissioned Treitzsauerwein to complete the book, but it remained unfinished because of Treitzsauerwein's death in 1527.

Weisskunig is a "unique mixture of history and heroic romance". The work is also a mirror of princes, intended for his successors, other princes and members of the expanding imperial bureaucratic class. Apparently Maximilian also planned to produce a Volksbuch suitable for a larger, less elite audience, but was unable to carry out that project. Maximilian did not intend the work to be published commercially; copies were presented to specially selected recipients. Although a print was made in 1526, the full work was not published until 1775.

== Content ==
The work is composed of three sections. The first deals with the life of Frederick III. The second covers the life of Maximilian from his birth to his marriage in 1477, describing his upbringing and inclinations. The third continues with his reign up to 1513, ending abruptly with the Battle of Vicenza. In 1526 Ferdinand I, then King of Hungary requested Marx Treitzsaurwein to write a fourth section that would cover events up to Maximilian's death but Treitzsaurwein died in 1527.

== Reception ==
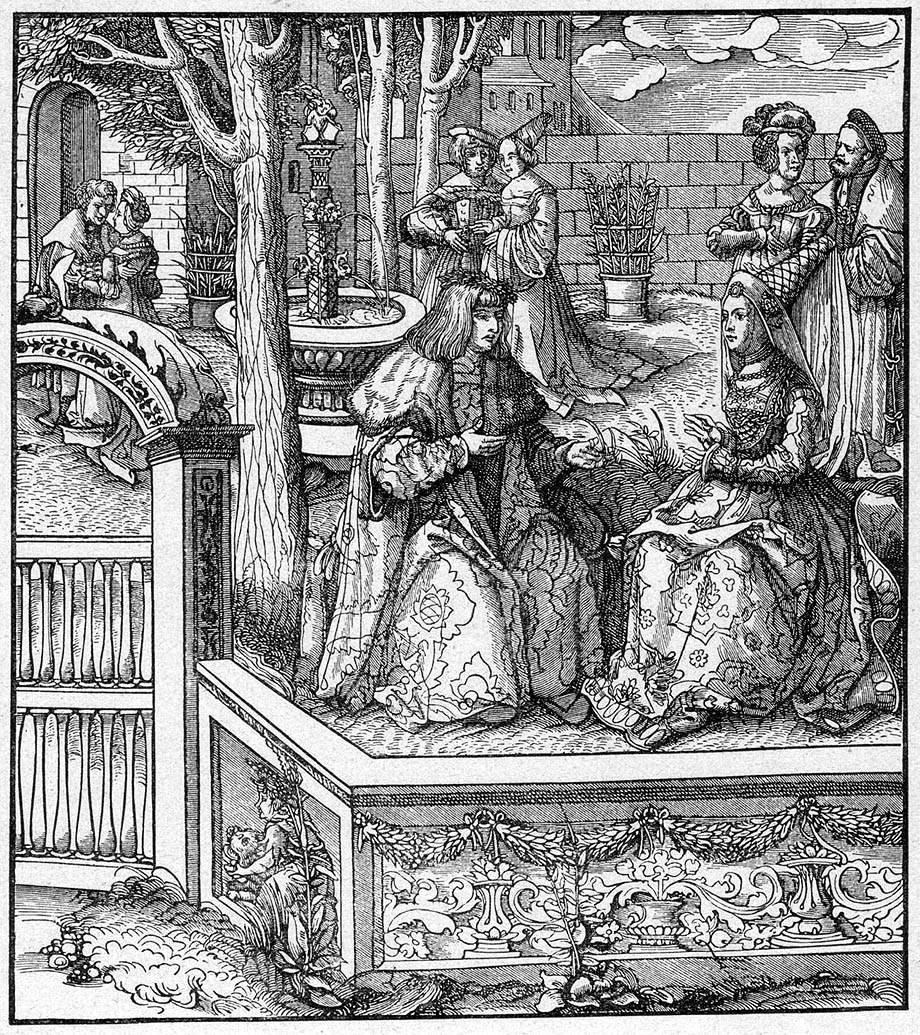
Maximilian and Mary of Burgundy, surrounded by other lovers who are caressing each other

As the work is a mirror of princes, political arts play a prominent part. The author opines that a successful ruler relies on five bases of ruling: understanding of God, of the influence of planets, reason, gentleness and restraint in using violence. A ruler needs a humane education and in order to maintain his authority, should be more knowledgeable than his subjects. This requirement is not only concerned with the type of knowledge needed for the immediate tasks of a monarch, but also liberal arts, minting of coins, foreign languages and manual labour skills. This scheme of education has attracted considerable debate regarding its humanistic nature (seemingly influenced by the emperor's friends, who had received a humanist education) and its universal validity. Elaine C.Tennant notes that the work pays attention to presenting "factual truth", and at the same time, does not shy away from narrative embellishment, in order to pursue a "higher truth", serving the author's propagandic intention. The readers are gently persuaded with a desirable picture of Habsburg preeminence. For example, it is subtly hinted that the King of Flint (Charles the Bold, who was Maximilian's idol in real life) was the aggressor and Frederick was forced to act.

According to H.G. Koenigsberger, the book combines “the style and manner of Arthurian legend with romanticised autobiography”. The story is based on the lives of Maximilian, fictionalised as the “young” White King, and his father, the “old” White King, Frederick III, and recounts their dealings with contemporary characters whose identities are disguised but easily decipherable. These include the Blue King (the King of France), the Green King (the King of Hungary) and the King of Fish (representing Venice). Maximilian is depicted as a virtuous ruler favoured by God.

Alexander Kagerer remarks that the way love is described in the Weisskunig leans towards the erotic element, as shown in both the case of the Old White King (Frederick III, Maximilian's father) and fraw Leonora, die jung kunigin (Eleanor of Portugal, Maximilian's mother) and that of the Young White King (Maximilian) and the junge Königin vom Feuereisen (Mary of Burgundy). Physical beauty tends to be emphasized over character and other qualities.

== See also ==
- Cultural depictions of Maximilian I, Holy Roman Emperor
- Freydal
- Theuerdank
