= Flemish revolts against Maximilian of Austria =

Medieval revolts against the future Maximilian I

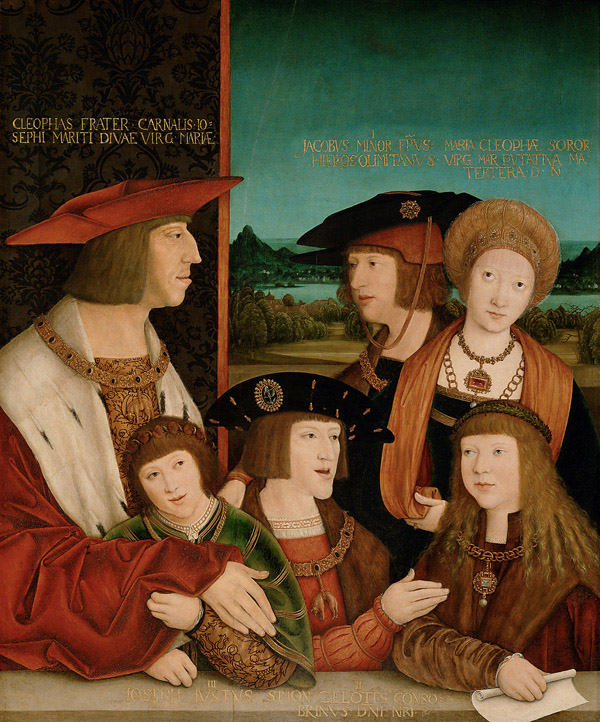
Maximilian I, Philip the Fair and Mary the Rich (back row), by Bernhard Strigel.

In the period 1482–1492, the cities of the County of Flanders revolted twice against Maximilian of Austria (from 1486, King of the Romans), who ruled the county as regent for his son, Philip the Handsome. Both revolts were ultimately unsuccessful.

== Background ==
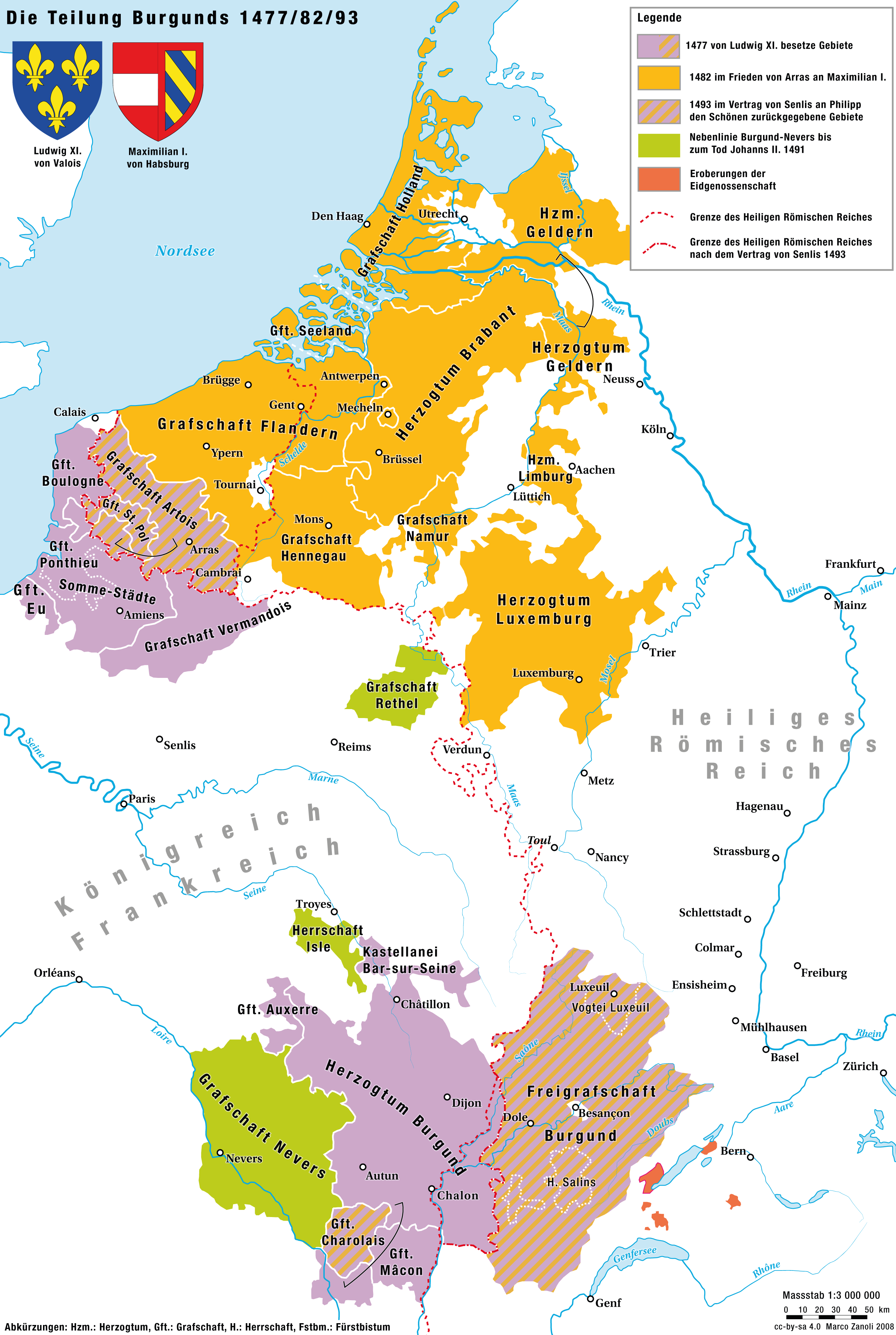
War of the Burgundian Succession (1477-1482-1493) Taken by France in 1477 Kept by Mary of Burgundy, and secured for her son Philip, by the Treaty of Arras (1482) Returned to Philip in 1493, by the Treaty of Senlis Domains of John II, Count of Nevers

In 1477, Flanders was under Burgundian rule. When Duke Charles the Bold of Burgundy died in battle at Nancy that year, his territories passed to his daughter, Mary. The Netherlandish towns and their States General compelled Mary to sign a treaty, the Great Privilege, that reversed some of the centralization of power undertaken by Charles's father, Duke Philip the Good, and turned the Burgundian state in the Netherlands into a loose confederation of provinces.The Members (representatives) of Flanders obtained an additional Flemish Privilege, which required their consent in any constitutional change.

Meanwhile, the area west of the Scheldt (Royal Flanders), as well as other provinces of the Burgundian state, were claimed as reverted fiefs by France. Fearing French invasion, the provinces of the Low Countries levied an army of 100,000 men to replace the former ducal army; more than one-third of its troops were supplied by Flanders. Mary, seeking peace with her powerful neighbor, was involved in negotiations with Louis XI concerning a possible marriage to the Dauphin Charles (then only eight years old), but her embassy met harsh demands for territorial concessions to the French crown.

On the evening of 16 August 1477, Mary instead married Maximilian of Habsburg, son of the Holy Roman Emperor Frederick III, at Ghent. He would rule the Burgundian lands jointly with Mary, vowing to uphold the privileges granted to its towns and cities. The following years, a war with France was fought by Flemish armies under Maximilian, culminating in the 1479 Battle of Guinegate, a Burgundian victory. The German and other foreign troops were not well received in Flanders: the citizens of Ghent rioted against their presence in 1478.

When Mary died in a horse-riding accident in 1482, her four-year-old son Philip the Fair in turn inherited her realms in the Netherlands, creating a political crisis in the Burgundian lands. By the terms of the Treaty of Arras (1482), Maximilian was forced to cede Artois and Picardy to France, but retained control over Flanders as Philip's guardian. France nevertheless openly supported Flemish "particularism" against the Burgundians/Habsburgs.

According to Buylaert, the revolts were rooted in the cities' desire to maintain the autonomy that they had wrested from Philip's mother and predecessor, Mary of Burgundy, which Maximilian threatened to curtail.

== First revolt (1483–1485) ==
Several Flemish cities challenged Maximilian's guardianship of Philip, fearing centralization of power in the combined Habsburg lands. Ghent was the Archduke's main opponent, and went so far as to issue its own coinage in Philip's name, an act that was, in the words of H.G. Koenigsberger, "perilously near to a unilateral declaration of independence," because the unification of coinage was vital to the Burgundian Netherlands' prosperity. On 5 June 1483, the Flemish cities formed their own regency council for the young prince.

Since Philip was in Bruges, in the hands of the rebels, Maximilian attempted to negotiate, offering to dismiss members of his court that displeased the Flemish. Simultaneous troubles in the Prince-Bishoprics of Liège (Note: Following the murder of Louis de Bourbon, Bishop of Liège by William de La Marck.) and Utrecht, (Note: The Second Utrecht Civil War, involving the Burgundian bishop of Utrecht.) meant that the archduke could not intervene until 1484. His relationship with Flanders deteriorated as the Knights of the Golden Fleece at Dendermonde deposed him as head of their Order, Bruges refused to admit the archduke into their city with a company of more than a dozen people, and the commander of the Flemish armies proclaimed himself lieutenant-general in the name of Philip the Fair.

Flanders attempted to forge an alliance with the neighboring Duchy of Brabant, but did not succeed. In November 1484, Maximilian convened the States General; Flanders did not attend, but the other provinces of the Burgundian Netherlands pledged their support to the archduke, enraged as they were by the Flemish cities' unwillingness to cooperate (in particular, Bruges and Ghent had attempted to block Antwerp's trade routes). Instead, the cities and nobility of Brabant ultimately joined the Habsburg side. In France, Louis XI had died, and the new King Charles VIII was underage. His regency council withdrew its armies in spite of French promises to support the Flemish, but the French did appease the Flemish towns by renouncing the Parlement of Paris' claim of jurisdiction over them.

1485 saw open warfare between the Habsburg prince and the Flemish. In January, Maximilian's army took Oudenaarde and subsequently defeated the forces of Ghent under their own walls. But when a mutiny broke out in his army, he was forced to retreat; French troops led by Crèvecœur then entered the city. The French, however, misbehaved so badly when in Flanders that they too were soon forced to leave for Tournai.

The following summer, first Bruges and then Ghent saw a coup d'état in favor of Maximilian. On 21 June, Bruges surrendered, acknowledging Maximilian I as its mambourg (Note: Protector; A title previously awarded to the Dukes of Burgundy.) followed by a similar acknowledgment by Ghent a week later. Philip the Fair was returned to his father on July 6. The archduke made a treaty with Ghent and Bruges, confirming the cities' privileges, but soon revoked all these terms: he had 33 rebel leaders executed, many more banished, and the city's privileges were to be reviewed and revised by a committee.

== Second revolt (1487–1492) ==
With the rebels in the Netherlands subdued, Maximilian again turned his attention to France and raised taxes in the rich Southern Netherlands to finance his military campaigns. Compared to the period of Maximilian and Mary's joint reign, the taxes levied on Flanders had doubled by 1487, while the seigniorage on silver coins had risen to 120 groats per mark (effectively 12%), up from at most three groats under Philip the Good. Inflation grew rampant, with food prices rising, in some cases doubling; epidemics decimated the population. Economic hardship and heavy taxation, combined with the failure of the military campaign against France, sparked a second revolt in Ghent in November 1487, led, like the previous time, by the weaver's guild. From Bruges, Maximilian, now King of the Romans, negotiated with Ghent the following month. But when Maximilian, sensing danger, attempted to call in his troops (that had been left outside the gates) in January the following year, the frightened city closed its gates quickly. The guilds of Bruges joined the revolt, demanding publicity of the grievances of the rebels (a.o., plundering of the country by Habsburg troops) as well as the decision making process. They forbade Maximilian from leaving the city, then in February imprisoned him after installing new municipal officials loyal to Philip, and executed one of Maximilian's ministers.

Both the papacy and the Holy Roman Empire intervened in the conflict. The pope excommunicated the rebels (Note: Via the archbishop of Cologne; Koenigsberger notes that the decree may have been forged.) and Maximilian's father Frederick III, Holy Roman Emperor, raised an army of 20,000 men in Germany that reached Flanders through Brabant in April 1488. In the following month, Maximilian made a deal with his captors. He was to relinquish the title "count of Flanders", leaving control of the province in the hands of a government similar to the one that existed prior to 1482, in exchange for a yearly fee. Maximilian initially opposed the campaign of his father, and asked Frederick several times to stop it. Maximilian even suggested to Bruges that the city needed to appease the emperor by releasing the German hostages and gaining the support of some German princes. No side listened to his advice though. In the end, he and Philip of Cleves got dragged into the war between Flemish cities and Frederick. Maximilian justified his support for his father by stating that this had nothing to do with the Peace of Bruges, but a war Frederick carried out to protect the rights of Philip the Fair, and Ghent and Bruges had duties before the Holy Roman Emperor who was their sovereign. Maximilian had also sworn to uphold the Emperor when becoming the King of the Romans. As medieval law also stipulated that oaths made under duress were of no value, Louis Pynnock, the chamberlain and mayor of Louvain, argued that Maximilian had no responsibility to stand by his oath.

The Judgment of Cambyses (commissioned in 1488, completed in 1498), Bruges's symbolic apology to Maximilian. In a twist, the corrupted judge had the likeness of Maximilian's hated official Peter Lanchals, who was executed by Bruges. Painted by Gerard David. Previously, when Maximilian was moved to Jean Gros's mansion, his second prison, Bruges hired David to paint the strong iron gratings, added to the windows to prevent escape, in order to amuse the prisoner, whom they tried to cheer up in various ways.

Maximilian's military commander Philip of Cleves had volunteered to take his lord's place as the rebels' hostage, but subsequently joined the rebellion for what he considered treason by Maximilian. According to Haemers, the Flemings fully realized that a free Maximilian would not let himself be bound by this oath, so in the Peace agreement, they decreed that if the Habsburg side broke the treaty, Philip of Cleves as regent would defend the country against any invader, as also shown by the attitude towards Maximilian by Willem Zoete and Philip of Cleves before 16 May. The former Admiral of the Netherlands became the rebels' military commander and "terrorised the sea" using Sluis as a naval base. Brabantian cities including Brussels and Leuven joined the rebellion, as did the Hook party in Holland. Antwerp again chose the side of the Habsburgs, raising a mercenary army of ca. 1400 soldiers, including 400 cavalrymen.

In 1489, as Maximilian turned his attention to his hereditary lands, he left the Low Countries in the hands of Albert of Saxony, who proved to be an excellent choice, as he was less emotionally committed to the Low Countries and more flexible as a politician than Maximilian, while also being a capable general. By 1492, rebellions were completely suppressed. Maximilian revoked the Great Privilege and established a strong ducal monarchy undisturbed by particularism. But he would not reintroduce Charles the Bold's centralizing ordinances. Since 1489 (after his departure), the government under Albert of Saxony had made more efforts in consulting representative institutions and showed more restraint in subjugating recalcitrant territories. Notables who had previously supported rebellions returned to city administrations. The Estates General continued to develop as a regular meeting place of the central government. The harsh suppression of the rebellions did have an unifying effect, in that provinces stopped behaving like separate entities each supporting a different lord.

During the suppression of the rebellions, German blockades of Bruges' trade routes and ports, supported from the sea by a fleet led by the English Admiral Edward Poynings, paralyzed the Ghent's trade. The Flemish cities were forced to accept Maximilian as regent.

In October 1492, Philip of Cleves surrendered and in exchange got a pardon.

== Results ==
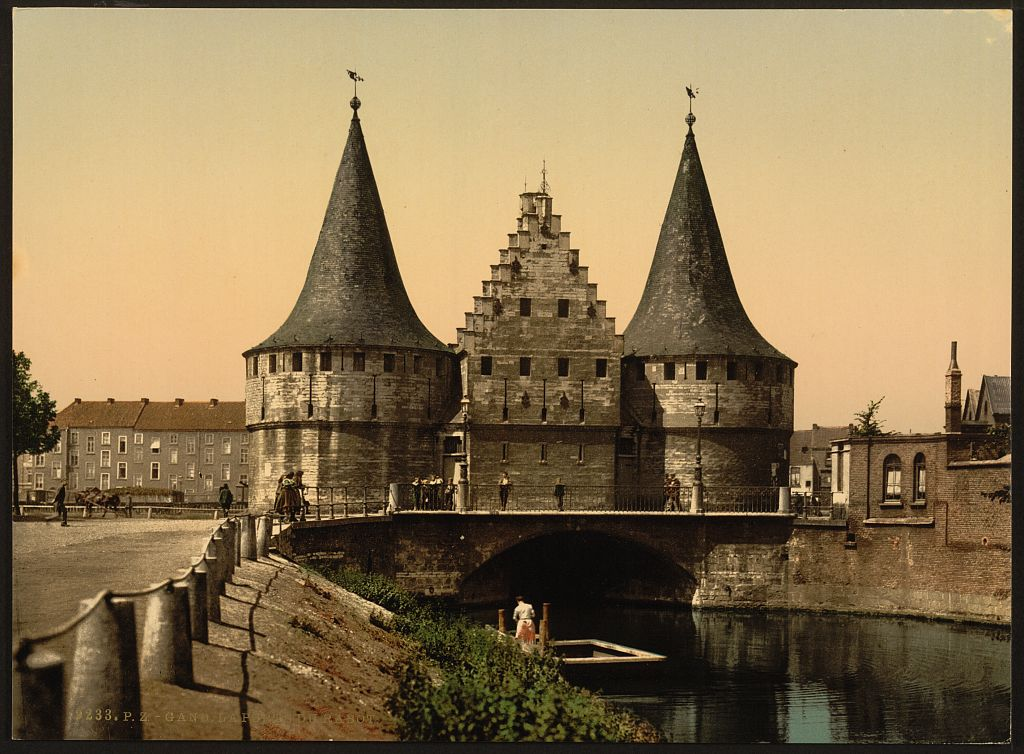
The Rabot in Ghent: a monument for the city's victory over Frederick III's besieging army in 1488.

In the Treaty of Senlis (1493), the new French king, Charles VIII, ceded Artois and Saint-Pol and renounced his claims to Flanders. These territories became part of the Holy Roman Empire, of which Maximilian became emperor in August of the same year. The next year, 1494, he formally bestowed the government of the Low Countries upon Philip, who proved popular with the nobles of the low countries.The larger part of Flanders remained in Habsburg hands until 1794. (Note: Except for Zeelandic Flanders. See Spanish Netherlands, Austrian Netherlands.)

At his inauguration in 1494, one of Philip the Fair's first administrative acts was the abolition of the Great Privilege. He swore to maintaining only the privileges granted at the time of Philip the Good. As during the revolts, many of the rebels had claimed Philip as their rightful and natural prince (as opposed to his father), Philip capitalized on this to restore several of his great-grandfather and grandfather's centralizing policies, while abandoning their expansionism.

One of the consequences of the revolts was the rise of Antwerp as an economic power, at the expense of Bruges. Antwerp (like Amsterdam) had lent support to Frederick III against the rebels because of the many privileges it had received from Maximilian I, and would see a "golden age" until the Dutch Revolt of the late 16th century.

Many of the old elite, fearing their loss of privileges, joined the revolts and thus got their inheritances confiscated, accelerating their downfall. They got replaced completely by a new elite loyal to the Habsburgs.

== Views of historians ==
Helmut Koenigsberger criticizes the erratic leadership of Maximilian, who was brave but hardly understood the Netherlands and whose only consistent policy was the centralizing and expansionist one that had failed under the Charles the Bold. Koenigsberger believes that it was the Estates' desire for the survival of the country that made the Burgundian monarchy survive. Jean Berenger and C. A. Simpson state that Maximilian, as a gifted military champion and organizer, saved the Netherlands from France, although the conflict between the Estates and his personal ambitions caused a short-term catastrophic situation. Peter Spufford opines that the invasion was prevented by a combination of the Estates and Maximilian, although the cost of war, Maximilian's spendthrift liberality and the interests enforced by his German bankers did cause huge expenditure while income was falling in a land partially in revolt. His rule was almost a time continuous struggle although the situation took a turn for the better at the end of the regency, when Artois and Franche Comté were also restored to Philip.

For Jelle Haemers, the conflicts were not between the autocratic prince and his subjects but between two factions that supported different ideologies of statecraft (a more polyarchical one and a more autocratical one), and both sides had their point. Many rebels were not barbarians but conscious citizens who believed that they had reasons to correct incompetent government, and Maximilian's side also showed some leniency but was forced to intervene more harshly than it had anticipated.

Haemers and Demets note the extensive use of female spies by rebel cities in the war, who kept track of Maximilian's armies' movements and carried out the communication between these cities. These women were middle-class people who pretended to be merchants, pilgrims or prostitutes (the cities did not employ real prostitutes as they did not trust them with tasks of military importance). Ghent alone had eighty women on their payroll (they received the same wage as male colleagues). One spy named Josine Hellebout, from Ypres, carried out no less than eleven missions between June 1488 and October 1489. Plenty of written evidences on this espionage network's activities were destroyed by the cities themselves when Maximilian won the war though.

== See also ==
- Austrian–Hungarian War (1477–1488)
- Burgundian Netherlands
- Habsburg Netherlands
- Ghent War (1449–1453)
