= War of the Burgundian Succession =

War over lands in Burgundy, 1477–1482/1493

- Part of French–Habsburg rivalry
Taken by France in 1477
Kept by Mary of Burgundy, and secured for her son Philip, by the Treaty of Arras (1482)
Returned to Philip in 1493, by the Treaty of Senlis
Domains of John II, Count of Nevers
Date	1477–1482
Location	France, Low Countries
Result	Treaty of Arras (1482)
Territorial changes	France annexes several Burgundian territories, including the two Burgundies and Picardian counties.

Belligerents
Burgundy-Habsburg: Burgundian State	Valois-Orléans: Kingdom of France Duchy of Guelders

Commanders and leaders
Mary of Burgundy; Maximilian I Philip the Handsome	Louis XI; Philippe d'Esquerdes; Catherine of Guelders

The War of the Burgundian Succession took place from 1477 to 1482 (or 1493 according to some historians), immediately following the Burgundian Wars. At stake was the partition of the Burgundian hereditary lands between the Kingdom of France and the House of Habsburg, after Duke Charles the Bold had perished in the Battle of Nancy on 5 January 1477.

== Inheritance of Charles the Bold ==
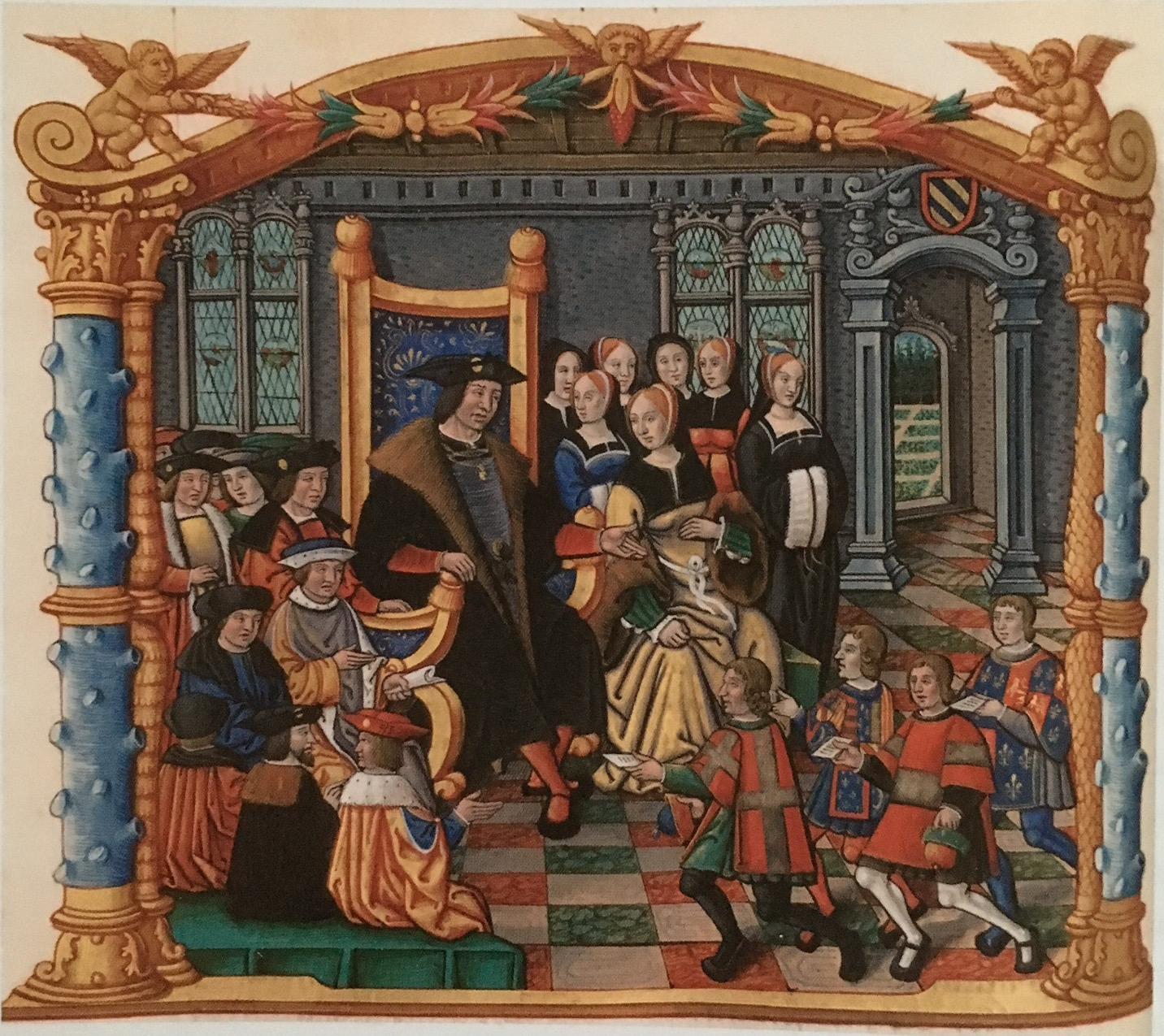
The contenders for the hand of Mary of Burgundy

Duke Charles the Bold of Burgundy died at the Battle of Nancy (January 5, 1477), leaving no sons. His only child and potential successor was Mary of Burgundy, while the closest male cousin of the late Duke was John II, Count of Nevers, the last scion of the House of Valois-Burgundy. In order to ensure her inheritance, Mary decided to claim all of her fathers lands, and was supported and accepted by nobles and regional assemblies in several provinces.

That was opposed by king Louis XI of France, who hoped that Mary would accept to marry his son and heir Charles, that would secure French control over the entire Burgundian inheritance. However, Mary was put under pressure by the States General of the Low Countries not to accept those offers, that would effectively deliver those provinces to France. To rally foreign support and calm the unrest at home, Mary granted the Great Privilege to the States General on 11 February.

In the meantime, Louis decided to take possession over those domains of the late Duke that in terms of suzerainty belonged to the French realm, including: Duchy of Burgundy, County of Vermandois, County of Ponthieu, County of Boulogne, County of Artois, County of Flanders and some other regions. Those provinces were claimed by the French crown as reverted fiefs. Already on 29 January, the assembly of the Duchy of Burgundy acknowledged the full reincorporation into the French realm, and during the first months of 1477, almost all of the aforementioned territories (except Flanders) were successfully seized by French forces, whose further advancements were opposed by local forces loyal to Mary, thus escalating the succession conflict into an open war.

== War of succession ==
By the spring of 1477, the conflict escalated on two fronts, first being the one between Louis and Mary, and the other occurring in several provinces between forces loyal to Mary and those that opposed her rule. Louis sought to exploit those internal conflicts and uprisings (such as the Guelderian War of Independence, 1477–1499) in Mary′s lands, and decide to capture more territories, including domains that laid outside the French realm, and belonging to the Holy Roman Empire, such as the County of Burgundy (Franche-Comté), the Duchy of Luxembourg and several other territories.

Besides the French candidate for Mary′s hand, there was also the captive Guelderian duke, Adolf of Egmont, who was released by Flemish rebels in Ghent on the condition that he would liberate Tournai from the French. This way, Mary's party could strike two blows in one move: achieve peace between Burgundy and rebelling Guelders, and forge an alliance between both powers against France. The Siege of Tournai (1477), however, was a failure, which complicated the reconquest of Artois and Picardy. Moreover, Adolf was killed in action (27 June), which eliminated the Guelderian candidate, and prompted the States of Guelders to ally themselves with France instead, continuing their uprising against Burgundy.

Mary's eye was then captured by the Habsburg archduke of Austria, Maximilian I. He possessed the means necessary to repel the French armies, and the Habsburg dynastic forecasts were favourable. On 19 August 1477 the wedding took place, thereby joining the houses of Burgundy and Habsburg together. Archduke Maximilian undertook intense efforts to retain as many of the Burgundian hereditary provinces, in which he had to fight off both France in the south and Guelders in the north, and simultaneously repress internal revolts, mainly in Flanders.

Maximilian first turned to diplomacy, reminding French king Louis of the 1475 Peace of Soleuvre in order to retrieve all French-occupied Burgundian territories. He even managed to get his father Frederick III, Holy Roman Emperor to threaten France with an Imperial war because of the occupation of Cambrésis. Louis XI relented, agreed to a ceasefire and returned some border cities including the Imperial City of Cambrai in the autumn of 1477. However, the Duchy of Burgundy and the County of Burgundy – the Burgundian heartland – remained in French hands for the time being. In the winter of 1477–8, Maximilian failed to procure the aid of his father Frederick III (who was at war with Hungarian king Matthias Corvinus) and of his cousin Sigismund of Tyrol (who had financial problems and depended on a French pension, so remained neutral).

In 1478, the provinces of Auxois, Charolais, and Beaune rebelled and tried to secede from the French king, but they had to surrender again in 1479. Louis XI then attempted an invasion of Artois. On 7 August 1479, the French troops were defeated by an army of Flemish and Habsburg forces in the Battle of Guinegate. Thereafter, Maximilian was occupied with the Netherlands, where he fared better in combating the Guelderians. With the conquest of Zutphen in July 1481, the Burgundians had militarily subjected Guelders, and by 1482, advocates of Guelderian independence were defeated on the diplomatic front.

== Peace treaties ==
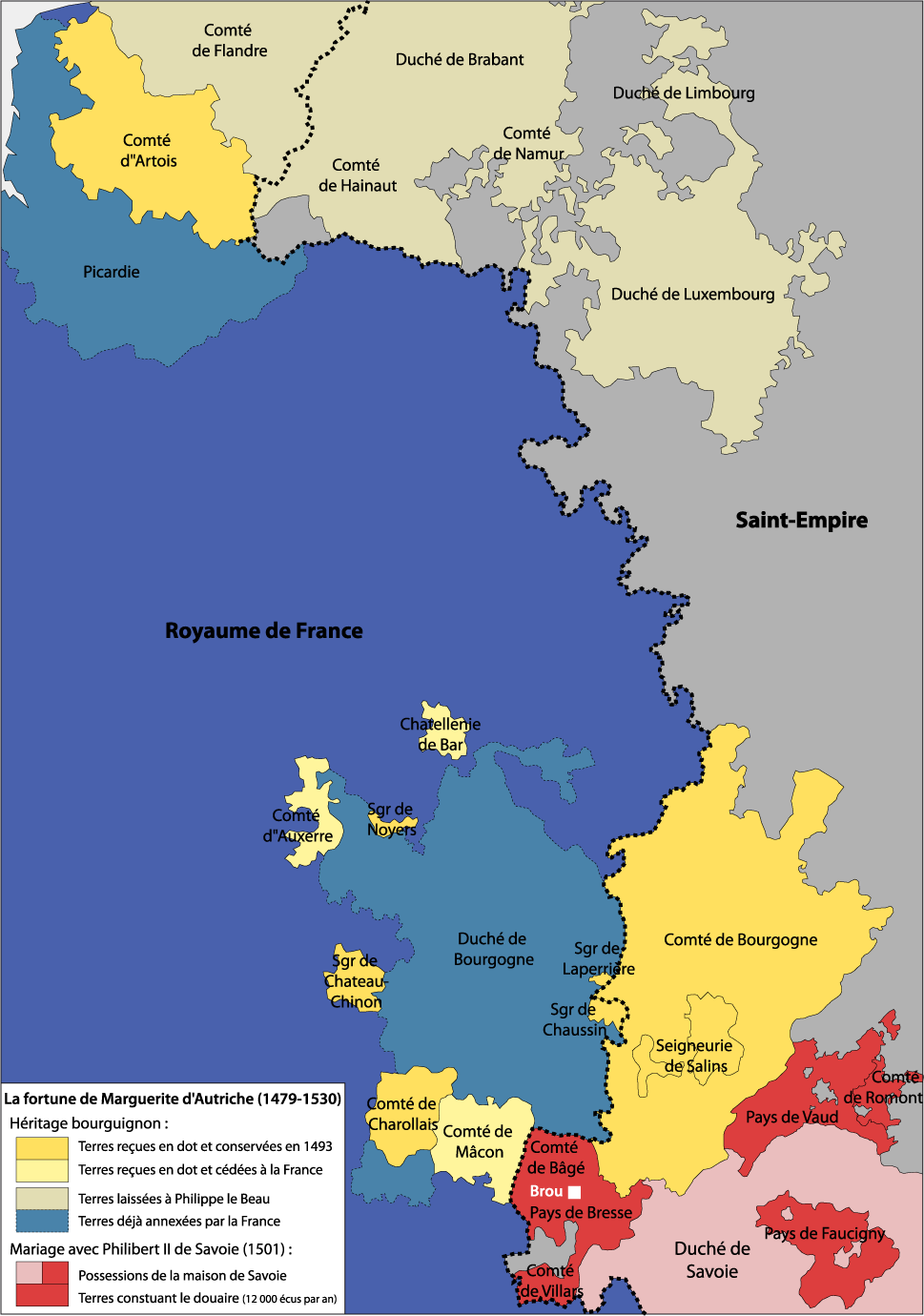
Margaret's dowry, as defined in 1482 by the Treaty of Arras, and redistributed in 1493 by the Treaty of Senlis

In 1482, Mary died and her four-year-old son Philip the Handsome succeeded as heir to her Burgundian lands, with his father Maximilian as regent. Negotiations were initiated between Maximilian and King Louis XI of France, and a compromise solutions were devised, based on the proposed marriage between Mary's and Maximilian's daughter Margaret with Louis' son, the Dauphin Charles. On those bases, the Treaty of Arras was signed on 23 December 1482. Maximilian recognized the French annexation of the Duchy of Burgundy and several other territories. Regarding the Free County of Burgundy (Franche-Comté) and County of Artois, they were treated as Margaret's dowry, and thus remained in French hands. France agreed to return the affluent County of Flanders, which passed to Maximilian (but soon rebelled against the archduke).

In 1483, the official engagement took place between Margaret and Charles, who became the King of France upon his father's death later that year. Since they were both still young, the conclusion of marriage was postponed. By 1491, Charles decided to abandon the idea of marrying Margaret, thus renouncing the Treaty of Arras. In order to avoid war, he agreed to conclude the new Treaty of Senlis (1493), and return Margaret's dowry to the Habsburgs. Thus, the Free County of Burgundy (Franche-Comté), Artois and Charolais were ceded by France to young duke Philip the Handsome. The final settlement of several remaining disputes was achieved much later, by the Treaty of Cambrai (1529), also known as the Ladies' Peace.

Only the situation in Guelders went unresolved for the time being. The 1491–92 Bread and Cheese Revolt in the County of Holland spilled over to Guelders, where popular revolts ousted the Burgundian troops. Meanwhile, the States of Guelders and regent Catherine of Guelders managed to secure the release of her nephew Charles II of Egmont from French captivity. After a host of French soldiers escorted him through Habsburg-Burgundian territory, Charles reached Arnhem in March 1492, and amidst great popular celebration, was able to assume power as the new independent duke of Guelders, in alliance with France. In 1493, the knighthood and cities of Guelders convened in Nijmegen, deciding to send the French troops home, and from their own funds raise a standing army of 2,000 men, wearing the duke's colours. Maximilian conducted two unsuccessful campaigns against Guelders in 1494 and 1495, while his son Philip the Handsome launched two more failed operations in 1495 and 1496. Finally, Burgundy and Guelders concluded a truce in 1497.

== See also ==
- Burgundian Wars
- Great Privilege
- Treaty of Arras (1482)

== Sources ==
- Dumont, Jean (1726). Corps universel diplomatique du droit des gens. Vol. III (2). Amsterdam: Brunel & Wetstein.
- Headley, John M. (1983). The Emperor and His Chancellor: A Study of the Imperial Chancellery Under Gattinara. New York: Cambridge University Press. ISBN 978-0-521-24444-2.
- Haemers, Jelle (2009). For the Common Good: State Power and Urban Revolts in the Reign of Mary of Burgundy, (1477-1482). Turnhout: Brepols. ISBN 978-2-503-52986-8.
- Haemers, Jelle (2022). "A troubled marriage: Maximilian and the Low Countries". Per tot discrimina rerum: Maximilian I (1459-1519). Wien: Böhlau. pp. 421–431. ISBN 978-3-205-21602-5.
- Holleger, Manfred (2005). Maximilian I. (1459-1519): Herrscher und Mensch einer Zeitenwende (in German). Stuttgart: Kohlhammer Verlag. ISBN 978-3-17-015557-2.
- Kuys, Jan (2014). "Catharina van Gelre (ca. 1440–1497)". Digitaal Vrouwenlexicon van Nederland [Digital Women's Lexicon of the Netherlands]. Huygens Institute for the History of the Netherlands.
- Noordzij, Aart (2008). Gelre : dynastie, land en identiteit in de late middeleeuwen [Guelders : Dynasty, Country, and Identity in the Late Middle Ages] (dissertation) (in Dutch). Leiden University. p. 289.
- Parker, Geoffrey (2019). Emperor: A New Life of Charles V. New Haven and London: Yale University Press. ISBN 978-0-300-19652-8.
- Potter, David L. (1995). A History of France, 1460–1560: The Emergence of a Nation. Basingstoke: Macmillan. ISBN 978-0-333-54123-4.
- Prevenier, Walter; Blockmans, Wim (1986). The Burgundian Netherlands. New York: Cambridge University Press.
- Saenger, Paul (1977). "Burgundy and the Inalienability of Appanages in the Reign of Louis XI". French Historical Studies. 10 (1): 1–26. doi:10.2307/286114. JSTOR 286114.
- Stein, Robert (2017). Magnanimous Dukes and Rising States: The Unification of the Burgundian Netherlands, 1380–1480. Oxford: Oxford University Press. ISBN 978-0-19-875710-8.
