= Treaty of Cambrai =

1529 peace treaty between France and Habsburg monarchy

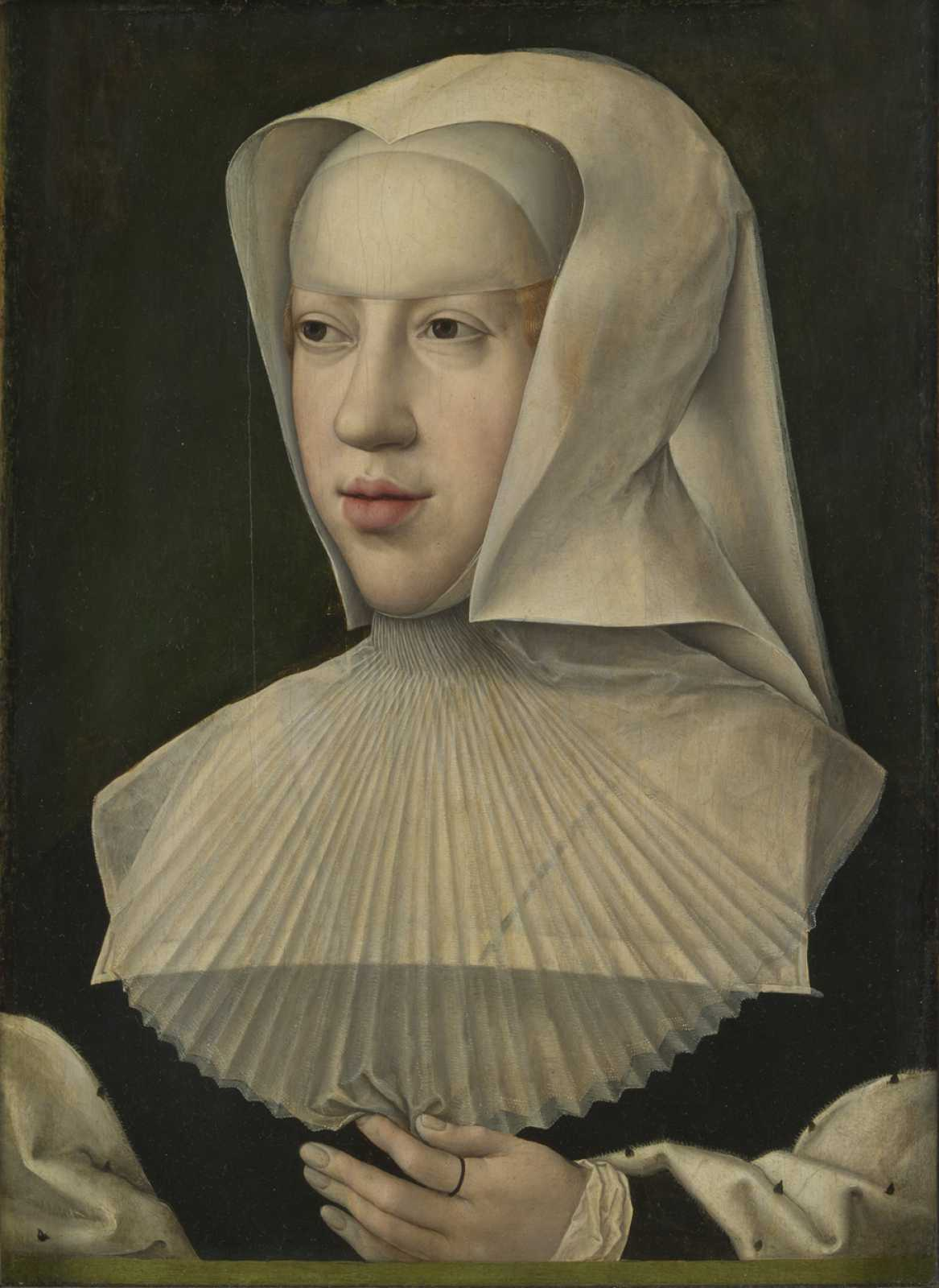
Margaret of Austria.

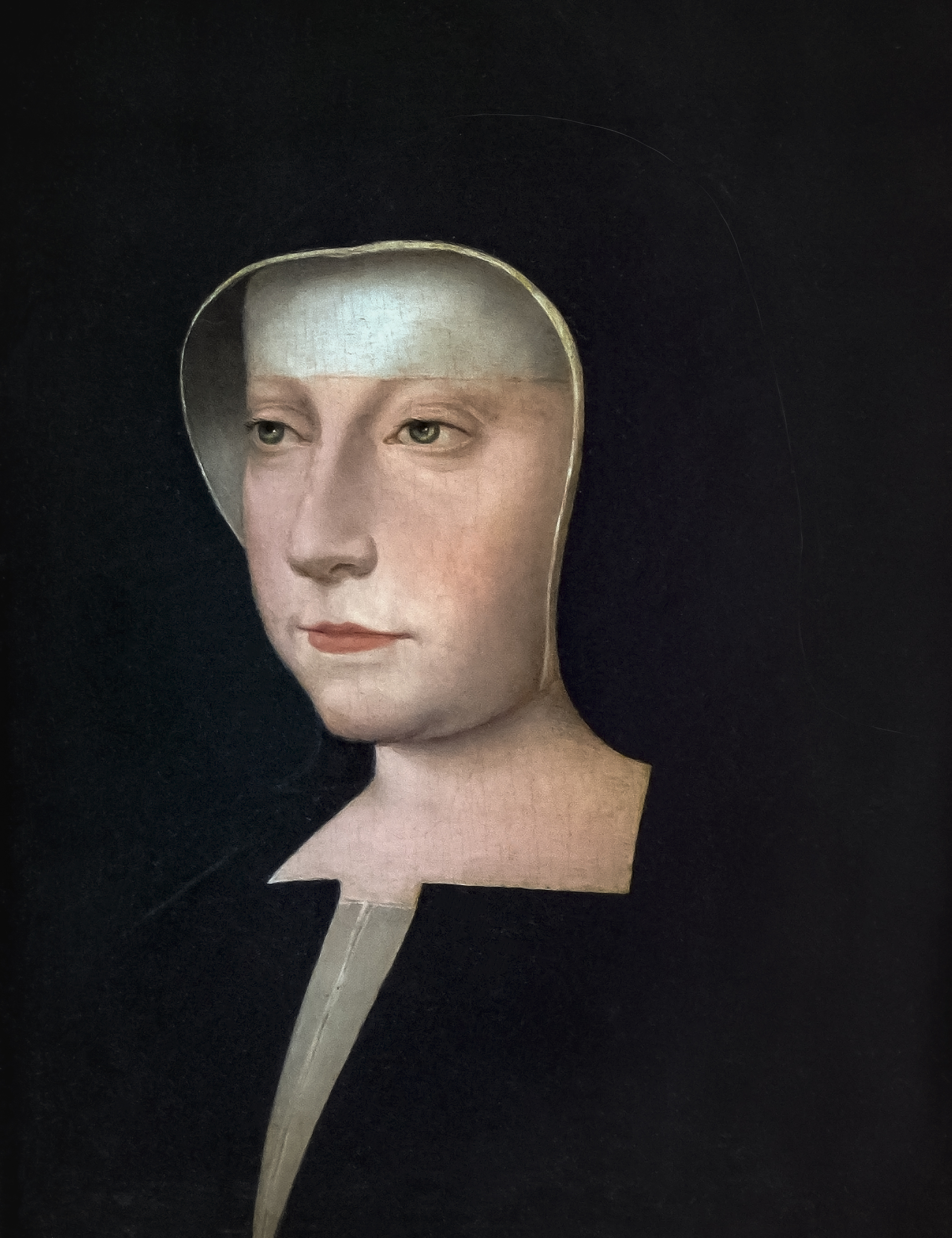
Louise of Savoy.

The Treaty of Cambrai, also known as the Paz de las Damas or Paix des Dames ('Ladies' Peace'), was an agreement made on 5 August 1529 that ended the French involvement in the War of the League of Cognac between French King Francis I and Emperor Charles V, who was also the King of Spain. The treaty confirmed the effective Habsburg hegemony in the Duchy of Milan and in the Kingdom of Naples.

The peace was negotiated and signed at Cambrai by two ladies: Margaret of Austria for the Emperor and Louise of Savoy for the King.

The treaty renewed the Treaty of Madrid (1526) but also introduced some new clauses, which were aimed to resolve several long-standing issues that remained unresolved by previous treaties, mainly those related to disputes over the Burgundian inheritance.

== Background ==
The Peace of Cambrai ended France's involvement in the War of the League of Cognac, which had lasted since 1526. It was signed in the city of Cambrai, the center of the principality-bishopric in the Netherlands (now the French department Nord).

This treaty is also called "Ladies' Peace" since women played an important role in its preparation: Francis' mother, Louise of Savoy, and Charles' aunt, Margaret of Austria. They represented both monarchs in negotiations and helped them not lose face. Marguerite of Navarre was also instrumental in the achievement.

== Terms ==
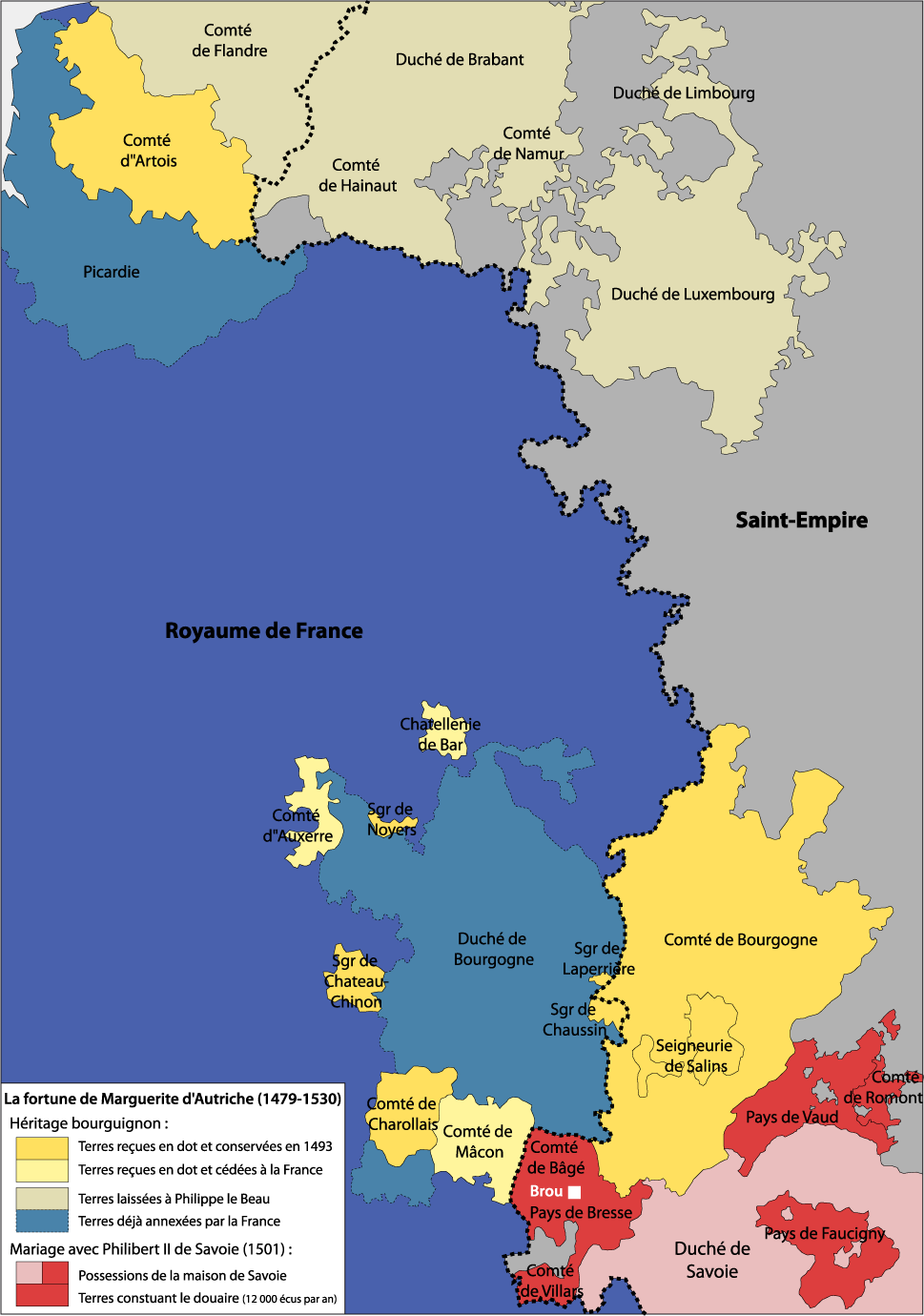
Territories settled by the Treaty of Cambrai, previously negotiated by treaties of Arras (1482), Senlis (1493) and Madrid (1526)

The treaty contained several territorial and political clauses. Francis renounced his claims to Italian lands, including the Kingdom of Naples (articles 24 and 33) and the Duchy of Milan (article 22). The French side also accepted that all of the former-Burgundian domains within the Holy Roman Empire, including the Free County of Burgundy, would remain in the Emperor's possession. In addition, France realm renounced its suzerainty over two important provinces, the County of Artois and the County of Flanders, which were effectively in the Emperor's possession. On the other hand, Charles accepted that all of the other Burgundian domains within the Kingdom of France, including the Duchy of Burgundy and the Picardian counties, would remain in French possession.

The treaty provided for the return of Dauphin François and Prince Henry, the future Henry II, to France in exchange for a ransom of 2 million écus. Francis I confirmed his consent to marry Charles V's sister Eleanor and married her on 7 July 1530.

== Effects ==
The Treaty of Cambrai, together with the Treaty of Barcelona (between the Emperor and the Pope), which was concluded in June 1529, meant the disintegration of the Cognac League; only the Florentine Republic continued to fight against Charles V, which led to the siege and the surrender of Florence in 1530. Nevertheless, the terms of peace did not satisfy Francis I. In 1536, a new conflict began between France and the Holy Roman Empire.

== See also ==
- Treaty of Arras (1482)
- Treaty of Senlis (1493)

== Sources ==
- Baumgartner, Frederic J. Louis XII. New York: St. Martin's Press, 1994. ISBN 0-312-12072-9.
- Black, Jeremy. "Dynasty Forged by Fire." MHQ: The Quarterly Journal of Military History 18, no. 3 (Spring 2006): 34–43. ISSN 1040-5992.
- Blockmans, Wim. Emperor Charles V, 1500–1558. Translated by Isola van den Hoven-Vardon. New York: Oxford University Press, 2002. ISBN 0-340-73110-9.
- Dumont, Jean (1726). Corps universel diplomatique du droit des gens. Vol. IV (2). Amsterdam: Brunel & Wetstein.
- Guicciardini, Francesco. The History of Italy. Translated by Sydney Alexander. Princeton: Princeton University Press, 1984. ISBN 0-691-00800-0.
- Headley, John M. (1983). The Emperor and His Chancellor: A Study of the Imperial Chancellery Under Gattinara. New York: Cambridge University Press.
- Mallet, Michael; Shaw, Christine (2014) [2012]. The Italian Wars 1494-1559: War, State and Society in Early Modern Europe. London and New York: Routledge.
- Parker, Geoffrey (2019). Emperor: A New Life of Charles V. New Haven and London: Yale University Press.
- Potter, David L. (1995). A History of France, 1460–1560: The Emergence of a Nation. Basingstoke: Macmillan.
- Taylor, Frederick Lewis. The Art of War in Italy, 1494–1529. Westport, Conn.: Greenwood Press, 1973. ISBN 0-8371-5025-6.
