= Estates General of 1464 =

Estates General États Généraux (French) / Staten Generaal (Dutch)
- Estates of the realm First Estate of prelates Second Estate of nobility Third Estate of boroughs

History
- Established: 9 January 1464
- Disbanded: 12 February 1464

Leadership
- Monarch: Philip the Good, Duke of Burgundy

Meeting place
- Bruges

The Estates General of 1464 was a parliamentary assembly of representatives of the constituent territories of the Burgundian Netherlands (now parts of France, Belgium, Luxembourg and the Netherlands). It was the first such assembly.

== Convocation ==
Each of the territories represented already had parliamentary institutions (provincial estates) of its own. The convocation of a meeting of representatives of all of these territories was the initiative of the States of Flanders (between 20 and 24 December), followed by Philip the Good (on 25 December), and his son Charles the Bold (on 26 December). Although in first instance reacting to the initiative of the States of Flanders, Duke Philip and his son were quick to adopt the convocation of the Estates General in support of their policy of centralizing their rule over their various territories.

== Composition ==
The precise composition of the Estates General of 1464 is unknown. A total of at least 81 delegates attended from the Duchy of Brabant, the County of Flanders (with a distinct delegation from Lille, Douai and Orchies), the County of Artois, the County of Hainaut, the County of Holland, the County of Namur, the Lordship of Mechelen, the County of Boulogne, and the County of Zeeland.
