= Treaty of Senlis =

1493 treaty between Austria and France

War of the Burgundian Succession (1477–1482–1493) Taken by France in 1477 Kept by Mary of Burgundy, and secured for her son Philip, by the Treaty of Arras (1482) Returned to Philip in 1493, by the Treaty of Senlis Domains of John II, Count of Nevers

The Treaty of Senlis concerning the Burgundian succession was signed at the French city of Senlis on 23 May 1493, between King Charles VIII of France and Maximilian I, who was King of the Romans and future Holy Roman Emperor and acted on behalf of his young son Philip the Handsome, the Habsburg claimant to the Burgundian inheritance. The treaty contained 48 clauses dealing with various political, dynastic and territorial questions that had been addressed by the Treaty of Arras (1482).

== Background ==
After the last duke of Valois-Burgundy, Charles the Bold, died without a male heir at the 1477 Battle of Nancy, his third cousin Louis XI of France was determined to come into his inheritance, especially the Duchy of Burgundy and the thriving County of Flanders.

However, Mary of Burgundy, daughter of Charles the Bold, and her husband, Maximilian, also claimed their rights, which led to clashes of arms culminating at the 1479 Battle of Guinegate, which Mary and Maximilian won. Nevertheless, Mary died in 1482, and her claims were inherited by her son Philip, who was still a child and thus under the guardianship of his father, Maximilian.

According to the Treaty of Arras (1482), Maximilian had to cede the County of Burgundy, the County of Artois, the County of Charolais and several other lordships to France as a dowry for the proposed marriage of their young daughter Margaret to Louis's son Charles, who became the new king of France in 1483.

In 1491, Charles VIII renounced the engagement with Margaret and married Anne of Brittany, who had been married in proxy to Maximilian. Thus, the question of possession over territories regarded as Margaret's dowry was reopened, and Maximilian urged the return of his daughter and the retrieval of all those lands. In 1493, Charles VIII, stuck in the conflict with King Alfonso II of Naples, finally had to acknowledge the claims.

== Contents ==
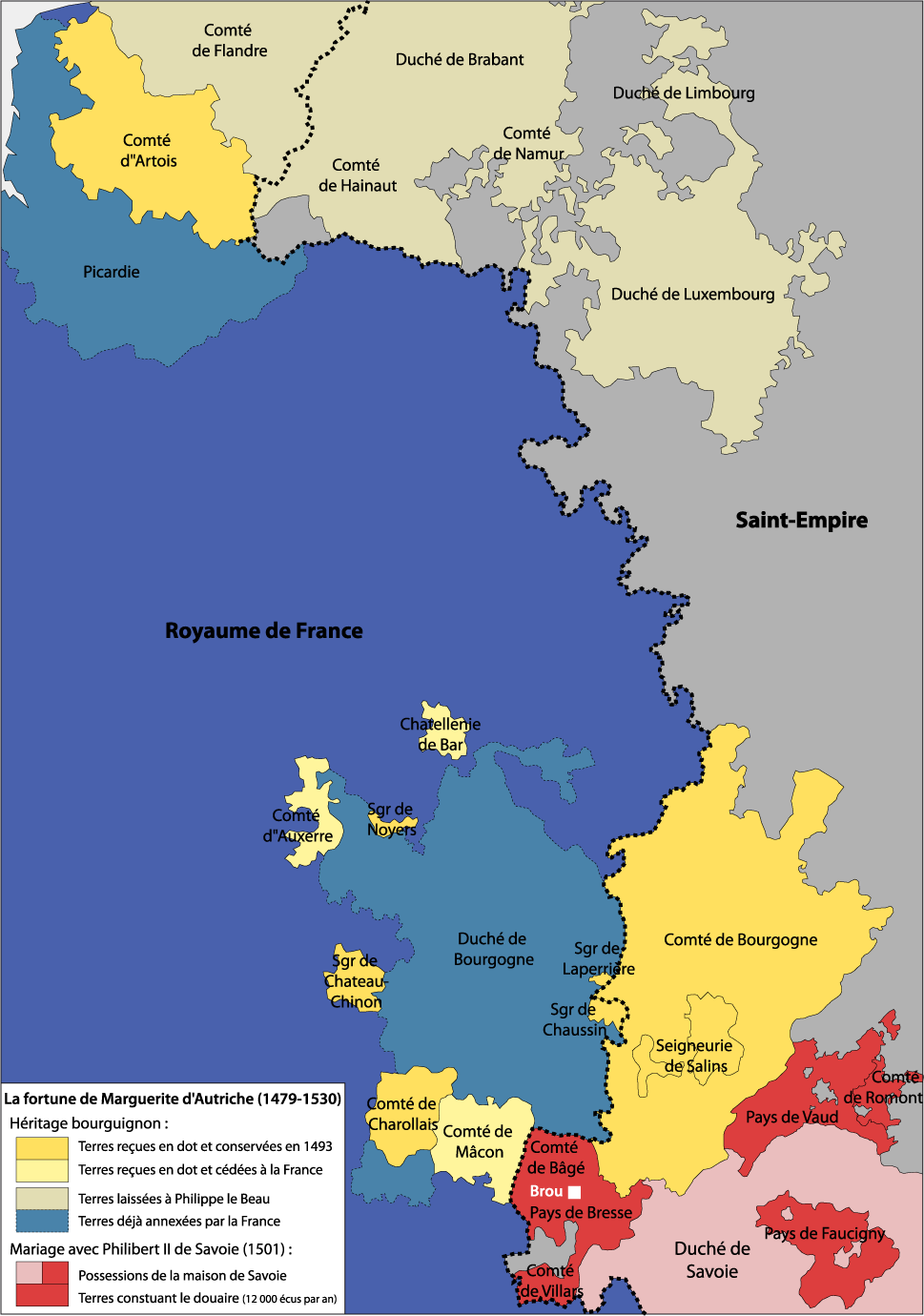
Margaret's dowry, as defined in 1482 by the Treaty of Arras and redistributed in 1493 by the Treaty of Senlis

By the Treaty of Senlis, all hostilities between France and the Habsburgs were officially over. Most of the disputed territories of the Margaret's dowry (the Counties of Burgundy, Artois, Charolais and some other minor territories) were returned to Habsburgs and relinquished to her brother Philip the Handsome.

The Duchy of Burgundy (whose capital was Dijon, not to be confused with the Free County of Burgundy, whose capital was Dole), which was seized by France since 1477, remained in French hands.

The Treaty of Senlis had 48 articles, called "items":

- 1. Peace has been made between the King of France and the Holy Roman Emperor.
- 2–3, 13. The position of Margaret of Austria, Duchess of Savoy.
- 4. A romise of friendship between Charles VIII of France and Philip of Austria.
- 5–9. The Counties of Burgundy ("Bourgogne"), Artois, Charolais ("Charolois") and lordship of Noyers ("Seigneurie de Noiers"), will be given back to the Holy Roman Emperor, but the cities and castles of Hesdin, Aire and Béthune ("Betune"), remain in the possession of the King of France.
- 10. The Houses of Flanders, Artois and Conflans are given back to and delivered to the Holy Roman Emperor.
- 11. The King of France will enjoy the Counties of Mâcon ("Mâconnois"), Auxerre ("Auxerrois") and the lordship of Bar-sur-Seine.
- 18. This peace treaty has been concluded with the consent and agreement of the Bishop of Cambrai, the Count of Cambrésis, its clergy, towns and castles.

Returning to Habsburg feudal possession, Artois and Flanders were in time detached from the French formal suzerainty and officially annexed into the Holy Roman Empire. However, France still retained powerful legal claims and outposts in both provinces until the final settlements in 1526 and 1529.

== See also ==
- Treaty of Madrid (1526)
- Treaty of Cambrai (1529)

== Sources ==
- Dumont, Jean (1726). Corps universel diplomatique du droit des gens. Vol. III (2). Amsterdam: Brunel & Wetstein.
- Haemers, Jelle (2009). For the Common Good: State Power and Urban Revolts in the Reign of Mary of Burgundy (1477-1482). Turnhout: Brepols.
- Haemers, Jelle (2022). "A troubled marriage: Maximilian and the Low Countries". Per tot discrimina rerum: Maximilian I (1459-1519). Wien: Böhlau. pp. 421–431.
- Headley, John M. (1983). The Emperor and His Chancellor: A Study of the Imperial Chancellery Under Gattinara. New York: Cambridge University Press.
- Holleger, Manfred (2005). Maximilian I. (1459-1519): Herrscher und Mensch einer Zeitenwende. Stuttgart: Kohlhammer Verlag.
- Parker, Geoffrey (2019). Emperor: A New Life of Charles V. New Haven and London: Yale University Press.
- Potter, David L. (1995). A History of France, 1460–1560: The Emergence of a Nation. Basingstoke: Macmillan.
- Prevenier, Walter; Blockmans, Wim (1986). The Burgundian Netherlands. New York: Cambridge University Press.
- Saenger, Paul (1977). "Burgundy and the Inalienability of Appanages in the Reign of Louis XI". French Historical Studies. 10 (1): 1–26.
- Stein, Robert (2017). Magnanimous Dukes and Rising States: The Unification of the Burgundian Netherlands, 1380–1480. Oxford: Oxford University Press.
