= Charolais, France =

Historic region in France

Coordinates: 46.44°N 4.28°E

Coat of arms of the counts of Charolais

Charolais (French: [ʃaʁɔlɛ]; also Charollais) is a historic region of France, named after the central town of Charolles, and located in today's Saône-et-Loire département, in Burgundy.

== History ==
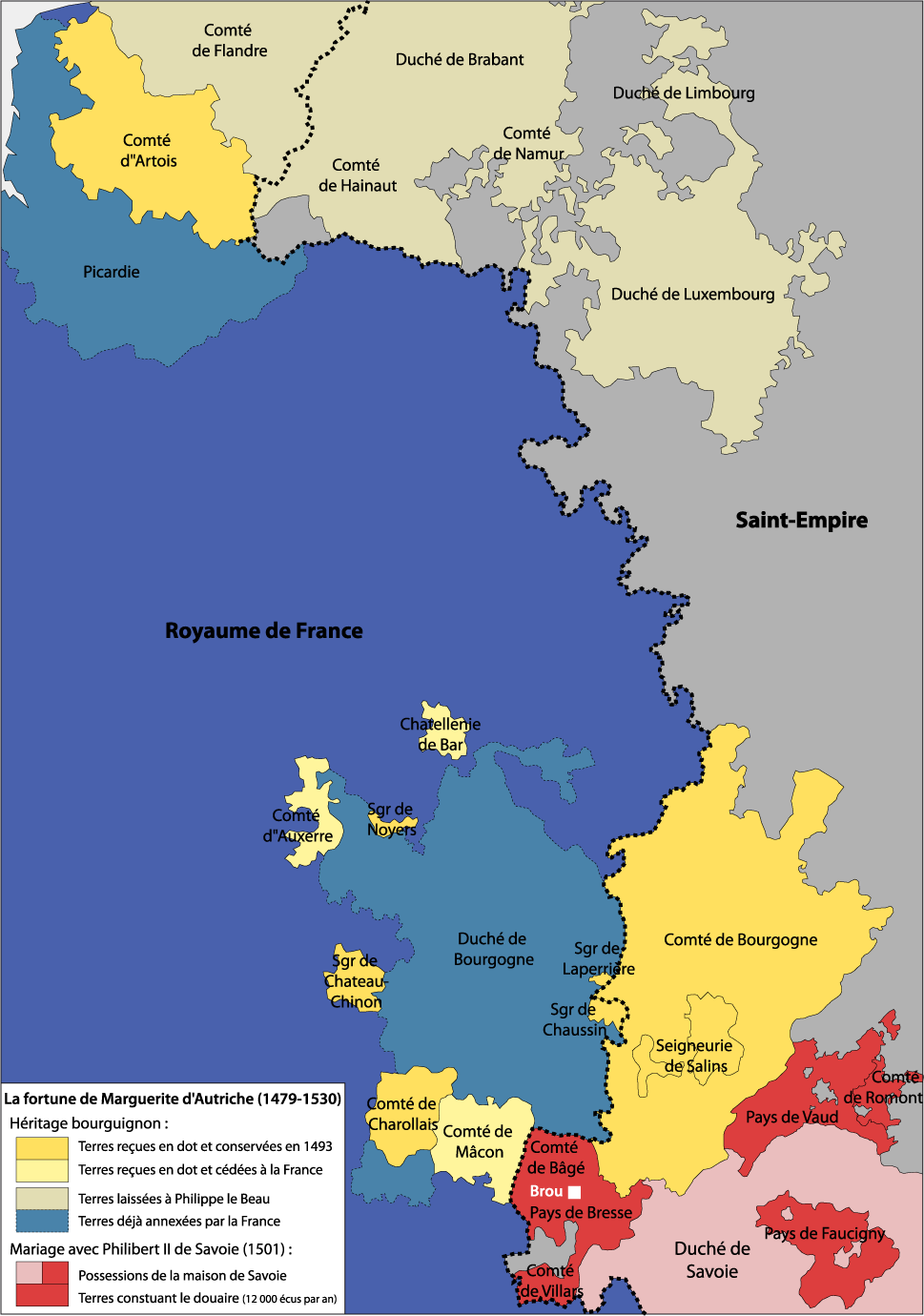
County of Charolais within Margaret's dowry, as defined in 1482 by the Treaty of Arras, and redistributed in 1493 by the Treaty of Senlis

It was held by the French noble house of Chalon-Arlay, until in 1237 Count John the Old ceded it to Duke Hugh IV of Burgundy. The County of Charolais was inherited by Hugh's granddaughter Beatrice, who in 1272 married Count Robert of Clermont, a younger son of King Louis IX of France and progenitor of the House of Bourbon. In 1314 it passed to Robert's second son John, whose daughter Beatrice married Count John I of Armagnac in 1327.

John's grandson Count Bernard VII of Armagnac sold the county to Duke Philip II of Burgundy in 1390. It thus became part of the House of Valois-Burgundy and the title 'Count of Charolais' was customary given to the heir apparent of the incumbent Duke of Burgundy.

After the death of the last Valois-Burgundy duke Charles the Bold at the 1477 Battle of Nancy, the county was seized by King Louis XI of France, thus opposing the claims of Charles' daughter Mary of Burgundy, who was supported by her husband, the archduke Maximilian I of Austria. The same year however, loyal to the duchess Mary, the County of Charolais rebelled in hope to expel the French. During the War of the Burgundian Succession (1477–1482), the region was claimed by both sides, until the conclusion of the Treaty of Arras in December 1482, when it was agreed that the County of Charolais will became part of the dowry of Mary's daughter, the archduchess Margaret, who was engaged to the French prince, and thus the County remained under the french control.

The engagement was later called off, and by the Treaty of Senlis (1493) Charolais was returned to the Habsburg dynasty, though it remained a French fief. Surrounded by French royal possessions, the County of Charolais shared a common history with the imperial County of Burgundy (Franche-Comté), as both passed to the future Emperor Charles V in 1506 and remained in possession of his heirs, the Spanish Habsburgs.

While the County of Burgundy fell to the French crown upon the 1678 Treaty of Nijmegen, Charolais was acquired by the Bourbon prince Louis of Condé in 1684. It was not awarded to the French crown until the death of Count Charles of Charolais in 1760, when Louis XV incorporated it into the Estates of Burgundy.

== Sources ==
- Dumont, Jean (1726). Corps universel diplomatique du droit des gens. Vol. III (2). Amsterdam: Brunel & Wetstein.
- Picot, Émile; Stein, Henri (1923). Recueil de pièces historiques imprimées sous le règne de Louis XI. Vol. 1. Paris: Société des bibliophiles françois.
- Saenger, Paul (1977). "Burgundy and the Inalienability of Appanages in the Reign of Louis XI". French Historical Studies. 10 (1): 1–26.
- Hubert Elie, Le Charolais dans l’histoire européenne (Lyon, 1956),
