= Great Privilege =

Instrument signed by Mary of Burgundy

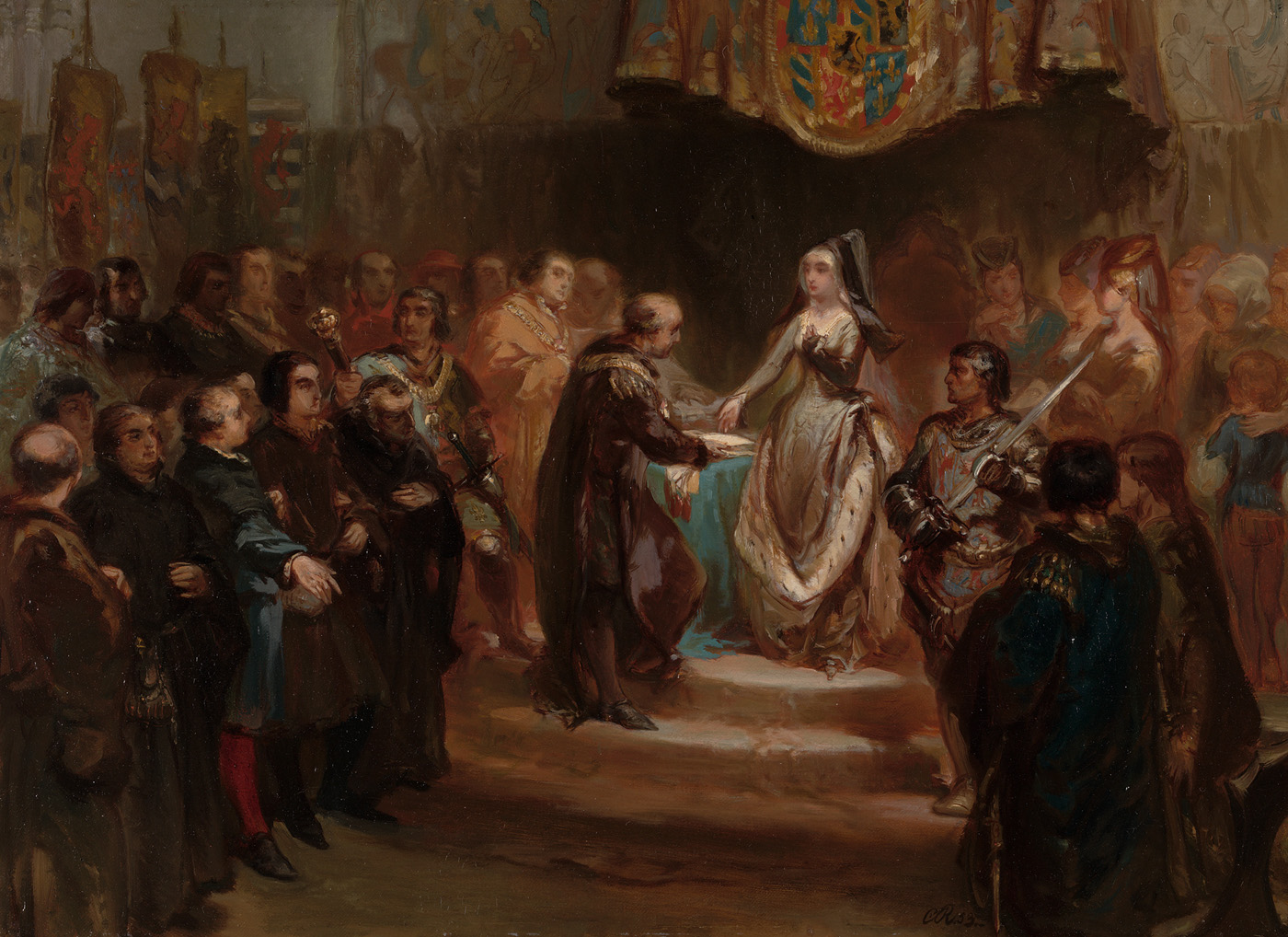
Mary granting the Great Privilege in a 19th-century painting by Charles Rochussen.

The Great Privilege was an instrument signed by Mary of Burgundy on 11 February 1477, only five weeks after she became Duchess, which reconfirmed a number of privileges to the States General of the Netherlands. Under this agreement, the provinces and towns of Flanders, Brabant, Hainaut, and Holland recovered all the local and communal rights which had been abolished by certain decrees of the preceding dukes of Burgundy Charles the Bold and Philip the Good in their efforts to create a centralised state on the French model out of their separate holdings in the Low Countries. The Great Privilege thus secured, at least for a time, certain democratic and legal rights—to local governments, of local governance, to local (Dutch) language, and to certain legal protections—for those living in the constituent states of Mary's territory.

== Background ==
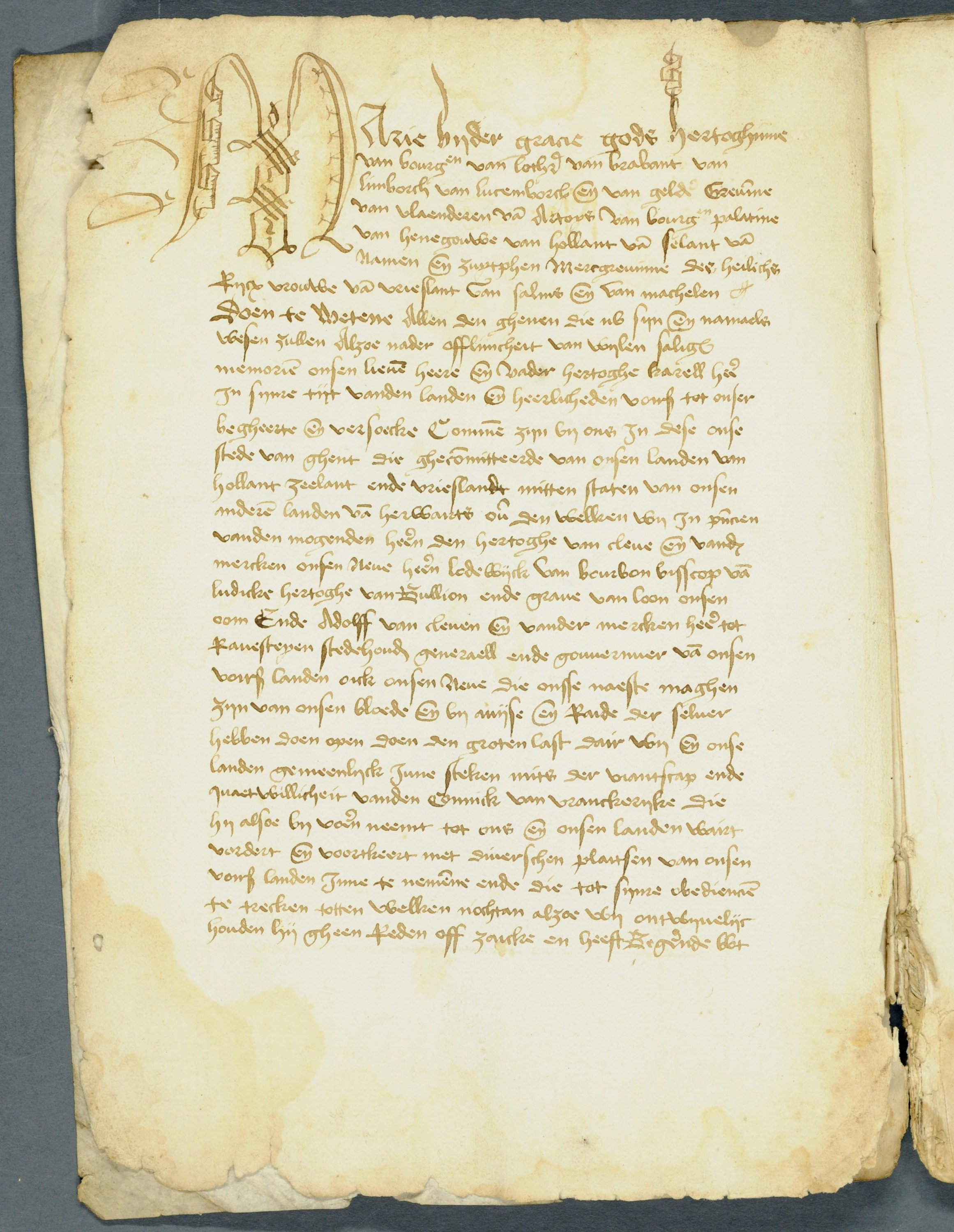
First page of the Great Privilege.

As Charles the Bold died unexpectedly on 5 January 1477, during the battle of Nancy, his daughter Mary of Burgundy became Duchess of Burgundy at the age of nineteen. At the time, her marriage to Archduke Maximilian had not yet been solemnized, so she faced alone the daunting task of defending the lands of the duchy to which she had succeeded against the various rulers of neighbouring countries. Mary's position was weak. Louis XI of France had taken Burgundy and Franche Comté and had also invaded Artois and Picardy following the death of Mary's father Charles the Bold. Among her own citizens there was great discontent, which did not make Mary's situation any easier. The Duchy of Guelders and the Principality of Liège had already declared independence. On 3 February 1477, an urgent meeting of the States General was therefore convened. It appeared that the States were prepared to recognise and support Mary of Burgundy as their sovereign with financial resources, but only with the granting of various concessions.

The Great Privilege granted by Mary met a large part of the demands and complaints of the States. These came down to dissatisfaction with the centralised administration of the Burgundian Netherlands. The power of the central government thus had to be curtailed, by a series of provisions, while the power of the individual provinces would be concomitantly increased. After the enactment of the Grand Privilege the authority of Mary seemed restored. It appeared that during her trip through all the States of the Netherlands that each principality itself still had considerable needs. These individual needs were also met by Mary and became known as the land privileges.

== Provisions ==
The main provisions were:

- The Parliament of Mechelen and the General Accounting Office were abolished
- A Great Council of 24 members was established to help Mary in the administration
- The particular customs of each of the regions were secured, so that the identity of the private law remained guaranteed.
- The duchess was not allowed to marry, to declare war or levy taxes without consent of the States
- Only residents of the own province may hold offices in the region, not outsiders
- Suspects may only in their own province come to court, no foreign judges
- The States may, at their own will be in session, anywhere and any time
- In the Dutch speaking provinces government letters had to be written in Dutch and not in French
- Restoration of the Accounting Office in The Hague

== End ==
Many aspects of the Great Privilege were ignored as Mary's position strengthened. After the death of Mary in 1482, her husband Maximilian I, acting as guardian of her son Philip the Handsome, abolished the treaty. The Flemish cities revolted to maintain their autonomy, but ultimately failed in their attempts.
