= Burgundian Netherlands =

Monarchical and political regime of parts of the Netherlands from 1384 to 1482

Burgundian Netherlands Burgundiae Belgicae (Latin) Pays-Bas bourguignons (French) Bourgondische Nederlanden (Dutch) Burgundesch Nidderlanden (Luxembourgish) Bas Payis borguignons (Walloon) Bos-Poéyis Bourdjignons (Picard)
- 1384–1482
- Flag Coat of arms

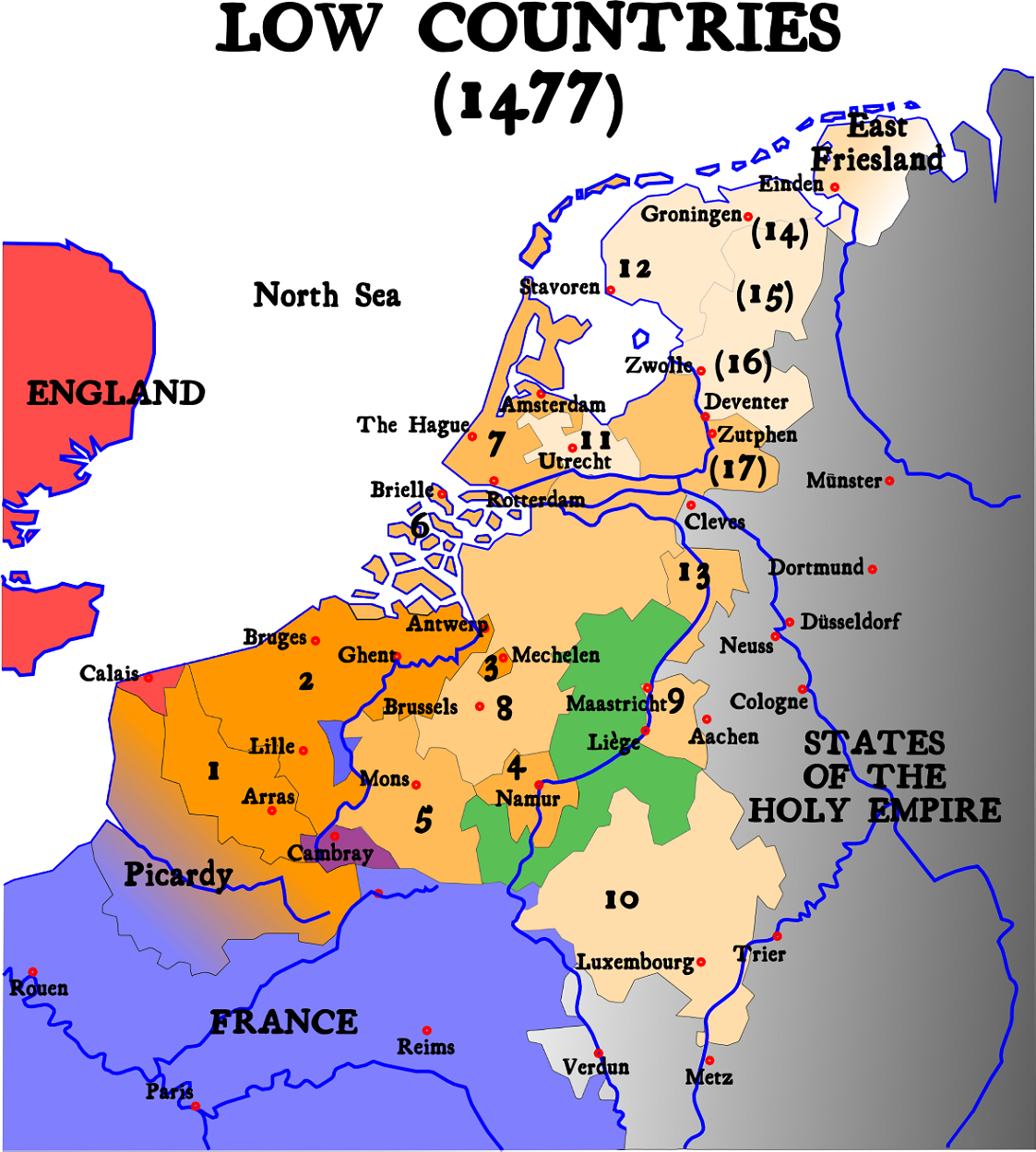
- The Burgundian Netherlands at the end of Charles the Bold's reign (1477)
- Status: Personal union of Imperial and French fiefs
- Capital: None; Mechelen (1473–1477)
- Common languages: Dutch, Low Saxon, West Frisian, Walloon, Luxembourgish, French
- Religion: Roman Catholicism
- Government: Composite monarchy
- Legislature: States General of the Netherlands
- Historical era: Late Middle Ages
  - Established: 1384
  - Disestablished: 1482
Preceded by
County of Flanders
County of Hainaut
Duchy of Luxembourg
County of Artois
Duchy of Guelders
County of Namur
Duchy of Brabant
County of Holland
Prince-Bishopric of Utrecht
Prince-Bishopric of Liège
Lordship of Mechelen
Margraviate of Antwerp
County of Zeeland
Duchy of Limburg
County of Boulogne
County of Zutphen
County of Saint-Pol
Picardy
Succeeded by
Habsburg Netherlands
Kingdom of France

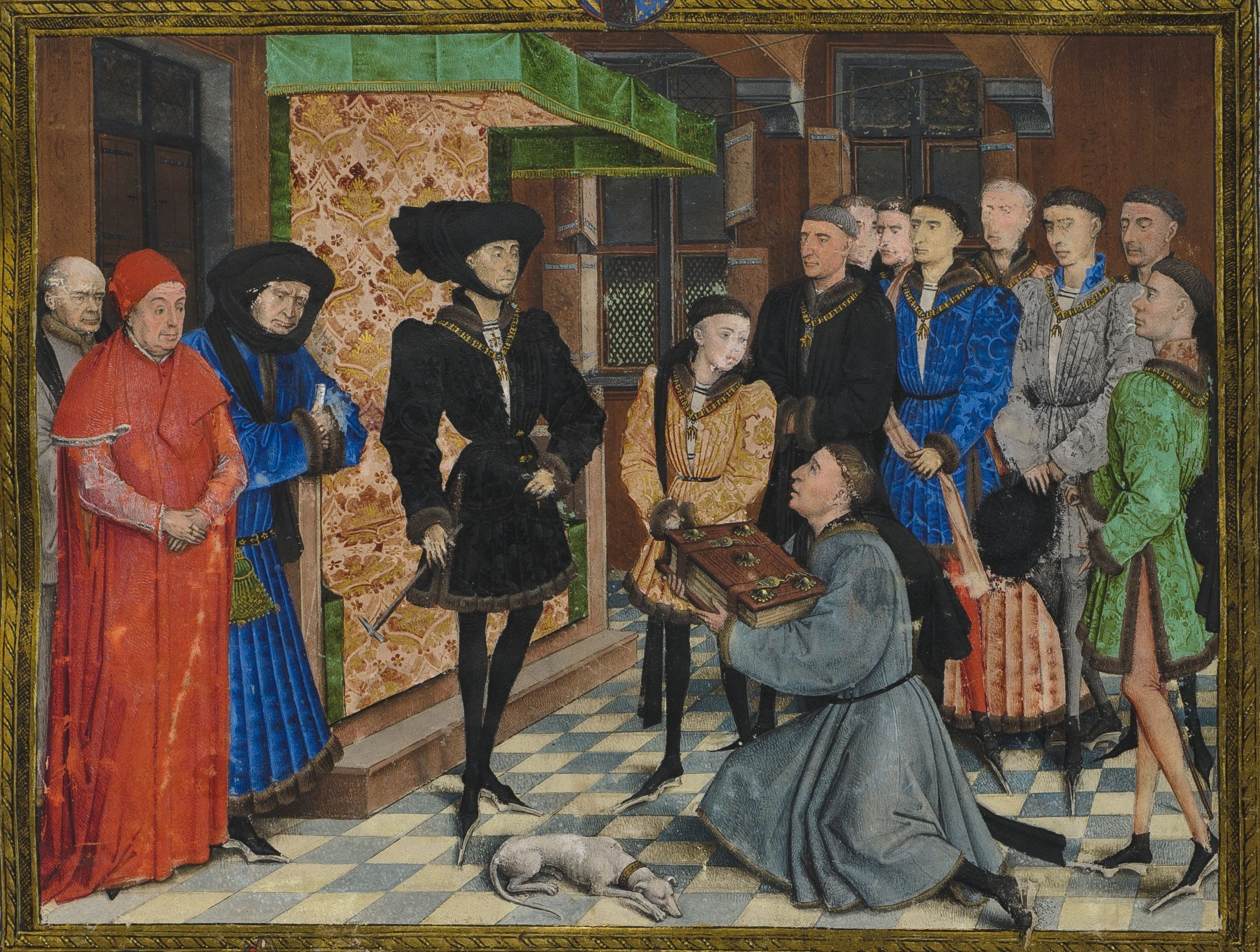
Jean Wauquelin presenting his 'Chroniques de Hainaut' to Philip the Good, in Mons, County of Hainaut, Burgundian Netherlands

History of the Low Countries (schematic)
Frisii		Germanic tribes		Belgae & Celts			
Frisii	Cana– nefates (Note: Roman foederati)	Chamavi, Tubantes (Note: The Chamavi merged into the confederation of the Franks; the Tubantes merged into the confederation of the Saxons.)		Gallia Belgica (55 BC–c. 5th century AD); Germania Inferior (83–c. 5th century)			
Frisii	Cana– nefates	Salian Franks		Batavi			
unpopulated (4th –c. 5th centuries)		Saxons	Salian Franks (4th–c. 5th centuries)				
Frisian Kingdom (c. 6th century – 734)		Saxons	Frankish Kingdom (481–843)—Carolingian Empire (800–843)				
Frisian Kingdom (c. 6th century – 734)		Austrasia (511–687)					
Middle Francia (843–855)				West; Francia (from 843)	Middle Francia (843–855)		
Kingdom of Lotharingia (Note: Part of East Francia after 939, divided in Upper Lorraine (as part of West Francia) and Lower Lorraine (as part of East Francia) in 959.) (855–959); Duchy of Lower Lorraine (Note: Lower Lorraine—also referred to as Lothier—disintegrated into several smaller independent territories and only the title of a "Duke of Lothier" remained, held by Brabant.) (from 959)			Kingdom of Lotharingia (855–959); Duchy of Lower Lorraine (from 959)	West; Francia (from 843)	Kingdom of Lotharingia (855–959); Duchy of Lower Lorraine (from 959)		
Frisia			Kingdom of Lotharingia (855–959); Duchy of Lower Lorraine (from 959)	County of Flanders (Note: Including County of Artois (part of Flanders until 1237) and Tournaisis.) (862–1384)	Kingdom of Lotharingia (855–959); Duchy of Lower Lorraine (from 959)		
Frisian; Freedom (Note: Lordship of Frisia and Lordship of Groningen (including the Ommelanden) after 1524 and 1536 respectively.) (11th–16th centuries)	County of Holland (Note: Including County of Zeeland, that was ruled by neighboring County of Holland and County of Flanders (until 1432).) (880–1432)	Bishopric of Utrecht (Note: Utrecht included Lordship of Overijssel (until 1528), County of Drenthe (until 1528) and County of Zutphen (until 1182).) (695–1456)	Duchy of Brabant (Note: Duchy of Brabant included since 1288 also the Duchy of Limburg (now part of Belgium's Liège Province) and the "Overmaas" lands Dalhem, Valkenburg and Herzogenrath (now part of the Dutch Province of Limburg).) (1183–1430) Duchy of Guelders (Note: The county, later duchy, of Guelders consisted of four quarters, as they were separated by rivers: situated upstream Upper Quarter (the present day northern half of the Dutch province of Limburg), spatially separated from the three downstream Lower Quarters: County of Zutphen (after 1182), Veluwe Quarter and Nijmegen Quarter. The three lower quarters emerged from the historic gau Hamaland (named after the Chamavi tribe), and formed the present day province of Gelderland. Guelders did not include the Cleves enclave Huissen and the independent counties of Buren and Culemborg, that were much later seceded to the province of Gelderland.) (1046–1543)	County of Flanders (862–1384)	County of Hainaut (1071–1432) County of Namur (981–1421)	Prince- Bishopric of Liège (Note: Throughout the Middle Ages, the bishopric was further expanded with the Duchy of Bouillon in 1096 (ceded to France in 1678), the acquisition of the county of Loon in 1366 and the county of Horne in 1568. The Lordship of Mechelen was also part of the Prince-Bishopric of Liège.)(980–1791)	Duchy of Luxembourg (1059–1443)
Frisian; Freedom (11th–16th centuries)	Burgundian Netherlands (1384–1482)					Prince- Bishopric of Liège (980–1791)	Burgundian Netherlands (1384–1482)
Habsburg Netherlands (1482–1795) (Seventeen Provinces after 1543) (Note: The name Seventeen Provinces came in use after the Habsburg emperor Charles V had re-acquired the Duchy of Guelders, and an continuous territory arose.)						Prince- Bishopric of Liège (980–1791)	Habsburg Netherlands (1482–1795) (Seventeen Provinces after 1543)
Dutch Republic (1581–1795)				Spanish Netherlands (1556–1714)		Prince- Bishopric of Liège (980–1791)	Spanish Netherlands (1556–1714)
Dutch Republic (1581–1795)				Austrian Netherlands (1714–1795)		Prince- Bishopric of Liège (980–1791)	Austrian Netherlands (1714–1795)
Dutch Republic (1581–1795)				United States of Belgium (1790)		Republic of Liège (1789–'91)	United States of Belgium (1790)
Dutch Republic (1581–1795)				Austrian Netherlands (1795–1797)		P.-Bish. of Liège (1791–1794)	Austrian Netherlands (1795–1797)
Batavian Republic (1795–1806); Kingdom of Holland (1806–1810)			associated with French First Republic (1795–1804) part of First French Empire (1804–1815)				
part of First French Empire (1810–1813)			associated with French First Republic (1795–1804) part of First French Empire (1804–1815)				
Sovereign Principality of the Netherlands (1813–1815)			associated with French First Republic (1795–1804) part of First French Empire (1804–1815)				
United Kingdom of the Netherlands (1815–1830)							Grand Duchy of Luxembourg (from 1815)
Kingdom of the Netherlands (from 1839)				Kingdom of Belgium (from 1830)			Grand Duchy of Luxembourg (from 1815)
Kingdom of the Netherlands (from 1839)				Kingdom of Belgium (from 1830)			Grand Duchy of Luxembourg (from 1890)

The Burgundian Netherlands (Note: Latin: Burgundiae Belgicae, French: Pays-Bas bourguignons, Dutch: Bourgondische Nederlanden, Luxembourgish: Burgundesch Nidderlanden, Walloon: Bas Payis borguignons) were parts of the Low Countries that were ruled by the House of Valois-Burgundy between 1384 and 1482. During the Burgundian Age, those lands were also parts of the wider Valois-Burgundian State, which itself belonged, in terms of suzerainty, partly to the Kingdom of France and partly to the Holy Roman Empire. The Valois Dukes of Burgundy gradually acquired and united those lowlands into a political union that went beyond a personal union establishing central institutions for the first time (such as the States General).

The period began with Duke Philip the Bold taking office as count and lord of Antwerp, Artois, Flanders, Mechelen, and Rethel in 1384, and lasted until the death of Duchess Mary of Burgundy in 1482, after which the Valois-Burgundian State was dissolved, as Mary's titles and lands were inherited by her son Philip the Handsome, from the House of Habsburg, thus initiating creation of the Habsburg Netherlands.

In the 15th century, it was customary to refer to the Low Countries where the Duke of Burgundy ruled and usually resided as les pays de par-deçà meaning "the lands over here" as opposed to Burgundy proper (in Central France) which was designated les pays de par-delà meaning "the lands over there" (see also Terminology of the Low Countries).

== History ==
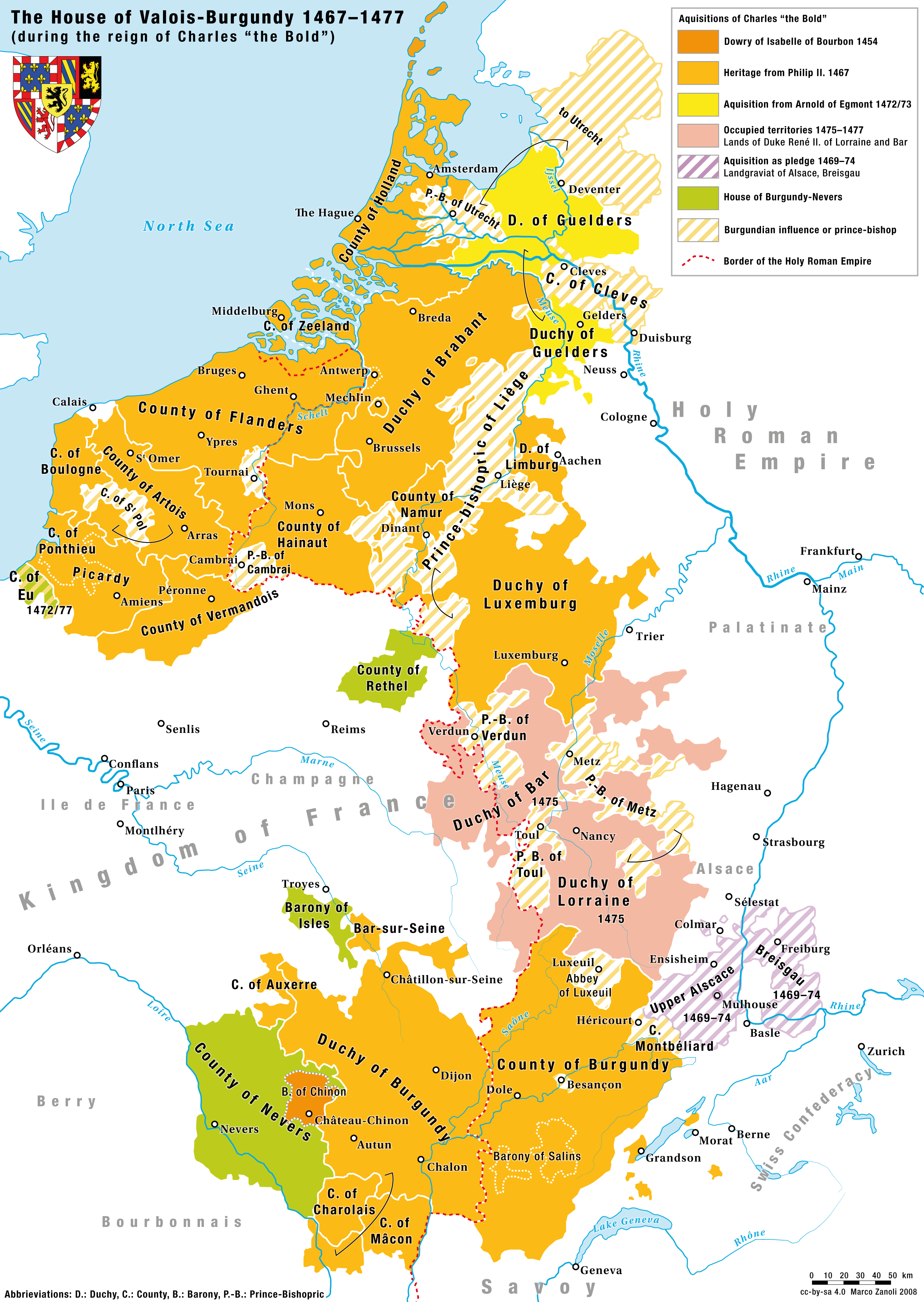
Territories of the house of Valois-Burgundy during the reign of Charles the Bold.

Around the 13th and early 14th century, various cities in the Low countries became so important that they started playing a major role in the political and economical affairs of their respective fiefs. At the same time, the political system of relatively petty lords was ending, and stronger rulers (with actual power over larger territories) started to emerge. In the case of the Dutch, these two developments resulted in the political unification of all Dutch fiefs within a supra-regional state. This process started in the 14th century, with the Flemish cities gaining previously unseen powers over their county. When Count Louis II of Flanders died without a male heir, these cities (Bruges, Ypres, and Ghent) arranged a marriage between the count's daughter (future Countess Margaret III) and the duke of Burgundy (Philip the Bold). By doing this, they set in motion a chain of events eventually leading to the establishment and expansion of the Burgundian Low Countries.

A fair share (but not most) of these territories were inherited by the Burgundian dukes, a younger branch of the French royal House of Valois, upon the death of Count Louis II of Flanders in 1384. His heiress, Margaret III of Flanders in 1369 had married Philip the Bold, youngest son of King John II of France and the first of the Valois dukes of Burgundy at Dijon, who thus inherited the County of Flanders. The Flemish comital House of Dampierre had been French vassals, who held territory around the affluent cities of Bruges and Ghent, but also adjacent lands in former Lower Lorraine east of the Scheldt river ("Imperial Flanders") including the exclave of Mechelen, which were a fief of the Holy Roman Empire, and furthermore the neighbouring French County of Artois. Together they initiated an era of Burgundian governance in the Low Countries.

The Dampierre legacy further comprised the French counties of Rethel in northern Champagne and Nevers west of Burgundy proper, both held by Philip's younger son Philip II from 1407, as well as the County of Burgundy (Franche-Comté) east of it, an Imperial fief which had been part of the former Kingdom of Burgundy-Arles.

In the following decades, the Burgundian dukes expanded their territories in the Low Countries by the acquisition of several Imperial States: Duke Philip the Good purchased the County of Namur in 1421, inherited the Duchies of Brabant and Limburg in 1430, and seized the Counties of Hainaut, Holland and Zeeland in 1432, and the Duchy of Luxembourg in 1443. His son, the last Burgundian duke Charles the Bold, in 1473 annexed the Duchy of Guelders, which had been pawned by late Arnold of Egmond.

The Valois era would last until 1477, when Duke Charles the Bold died at the Battle of Nancy leaving no male heir. The territorial Duchy of Burgundy reverted to the French crown according to Salic law, and King Louis XI of France also seized the French portion of the Burgundian possessions in the Low Countries. The Imperial fiefs passed to the Austrian House of Habsburg through Charles' daughter Mary of Burgundy and her husband Archduke Maximilian of Habsburg, son of Emperor Frederick III. Maximilian, however, regarded the Burgundian Netherlands including Flanders and Artois as the undivided domains of his wife and himself and marched against the French. The conflict culminated at the Battle of Guinegate in 1479. Though Maximilian was victorious, he was only able to gain the County of Flanders according to the 1482 Treaty of Arras after his wife Mary had suddenly died, while France retained Artois.

In her testament, Mary of Burgundy had bequested the Burgundian heritage to her and Maximilian's son, Philip the Handsome. His father, dissatisfied with the terms of the Arras agreement, continued to contest the seized French territories. In 1493, King Charles VIII of France according to the Treaty of Senlis finally renounced Artois, which together with Flanders was incorporated into the Imperial Seventeen Provinces under the rule of Philip.

=== Demographics ===
The population of the main provinces of the Low Countries in 1477 (Prince-Bishoprics in italics).

Province	Population in total	% rural	% urban	Province total as % of Netherlands total
Flanders	660,000	64	36	26.0
Brabant	413,000	69	31	16.0
Holland	275,000	55	45	10.5
Artois	140,000	78	22	5.5
Hainault	130,000	70	30	5.0
Liège	120,000	-	-	4.5
Guelders	98,000	56	44	3.8
Walloon Flanders	73,000	64	36	2.8
Friesland	71,000	78	22	2.7
Luxembourg	68,000	85	15	2.6
Utrecht (Note: The city of Utrecht accounts for the disproportionate degree of urbanisation, as the Oversticht (which included most of the modern Overijssel and Drenthe) was very sparsely populated.)	53,000	52	48	2.0

== Rulers ==
The Burgundian dukes who ruled the Burgundian territories were:

House of Valois-Burgundy, territorial Dukes of Burgundy

- Philip the Bold (1384–1404), son of King John II of France, by his wife Margaret III of Flanders
- John the Fearless (1404–1419), son
- Philip the Good (1419–1467), son
- Charles the Bold (1467–1477), son
- Mary of Burgundy (1477–1482), Charles' daughter, married Maximilian I of Habsburg in 1477

House of Habsburg, titular Dukes of Burgundy (see Habsburg Netherlands)

- Philip the Handsome (1482–1506), Mary's son; Maximilian I, his father, as regent (1482–1493), Margaret of York, his step-grandmother, governess (1489–1493)
- Charles V (1506–1555), Philip's son; Margaret of Austria, regent (1507–1515) and (1519–1530)

=== Under Valois-Burgundy ===
Year	Valois-Burgundian monarch	Acquired fiefs	Method	Reason
1384	Philip the Bold	County of Flanders, Artois, and Franche-Comté	Inheritance	Death of Philip's father-in-law, Louis II of Flanders, whose daughter and heir, Margaret III, was Philip's wife.
1421	Philip the Good	County of Namur	Purchase	Bought from John III, Marquis of Namur.
1430	Philip the Good	Brabant, and Limburg.	Inheritance	Philip of Brabant died childless, leaving his cousin Philip as his heir.
1432	Philip the Good	County of Holland, Zeeland and Hainaut	Treaty	Offered position after victory of the Hollandic cities in the Hook and Cod wars.
1443	Philip the Good	Duchy of Luxembourg	Conquest	
1456	Philip the Good	Prince-Bishopric of Utrecht	Client state	Philip managed that his illegitimate son, David, was elected Bishop of Utrecht, leading to the First and Second Utrecht Civil War.
1456	Philip the Good	Prince-Bishopric of Liège	Client state	Philip had his nephew Louis of Bourbon become Prince-Bishop of Liège, leading to the Liège Wars.
1473	Charles the Bold	Duchy of Guelders	Purchase	Bought from Duke Arnold. The house of Burgundy lost this title at Charles's death in 1477.
1477	Charles the Bold	Duchy of Burgundy (lost)	Annexation by France	Charles the Bold died fighting an alliance led by the King of France. France annexed the Duchy of Burgundy, but the title Duke of Burgundy remained in titular use, as seen with his only child, his daughter Mary of Burgundy (Mary the Rich).

=== Under Habsburg ===
Year	Habsburg monarch	Acquired fiefs	Method	Reason
1478	Mary of Burgundy	Burgundian Netherlands, To de facto Habsburg control.	Marriage	Mary marries Maximilian of Austria.
1482	Maximilian I, Holy Roman Emperor	Burgundian Netherlands, To de jure Habsburg control as the Habsburg Netherlands.	Inheritance	Death of Mary the Rich, Maximilian assumes rule.
1482	Maximilian I, Holy Roman Emperor	County of Artois (lost)	Treaty	Ceded to France by the Treaty of Arras.
1493	Philip IV the Handsome	County of Artois, Burgundy and Charolais	Treaty	Treaty of Senlis
1506	Charles V	All Habsburg-Burgundian lands	Inheritance	Charles becomes Lord of the Netherlands.
1516- 1519	Charles V	King of Spain, Archduke of Austria and Holy Roman Emperor; *Not in low countries	Inheritance	
1521	Charles V	Tournai and the Tournaisis	Conquest	
1524	Charles V	Frisia, Renamed Lordship of Frisia	Conquest	Conquered during the Guelders Wars.
1528	Charles V	Bishopric of Utrecht, Annexed as Lordship of Utrecht and Lordship of Overijssel	Liberated	Liberated from Guelders during the Guelders Wars.
1536	Charles V	Lordship of Groningen and County of Drenthe	Conquest	Conquered during the Guelders Wars.
1543	Charles V	Duchy of Guelders and the County of Zutphen	Conquest	Reclaimed and conquered during the Guelders Wars.
1549	Charles V	Habsburg Netherlands, Reorganized as the Seventeen Provinces.	Edict	Pragmatic Sanction
1555	Philip II of Spain	Seventeen Provinces, Established as the Spanish Netherlands.	Inheritance	Charles V transfers power of the Seventeen Provinces to his son Philip.

== Political ==
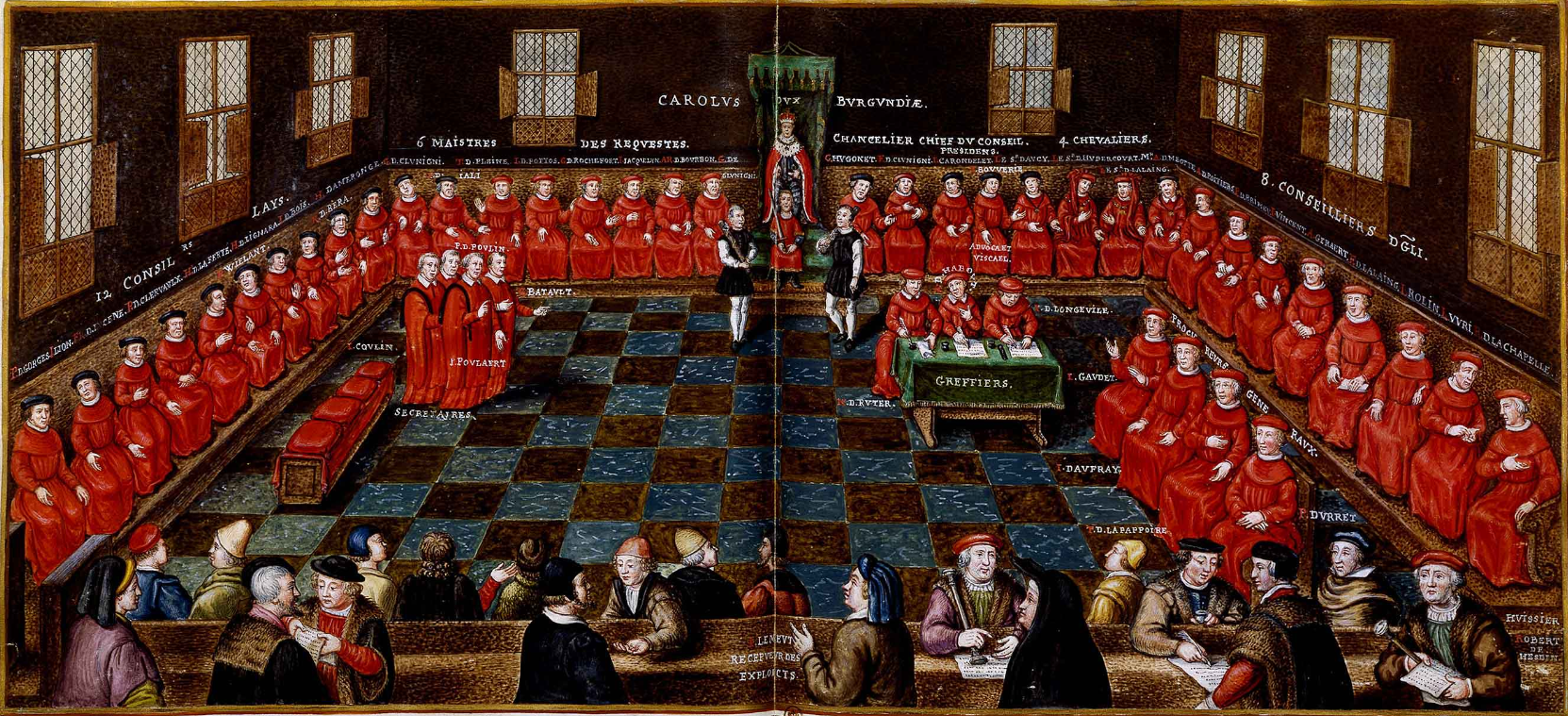
Session of the Parliament of Mechelen presided over by Charles the Bold. 17th century drawing after a 15th-century original

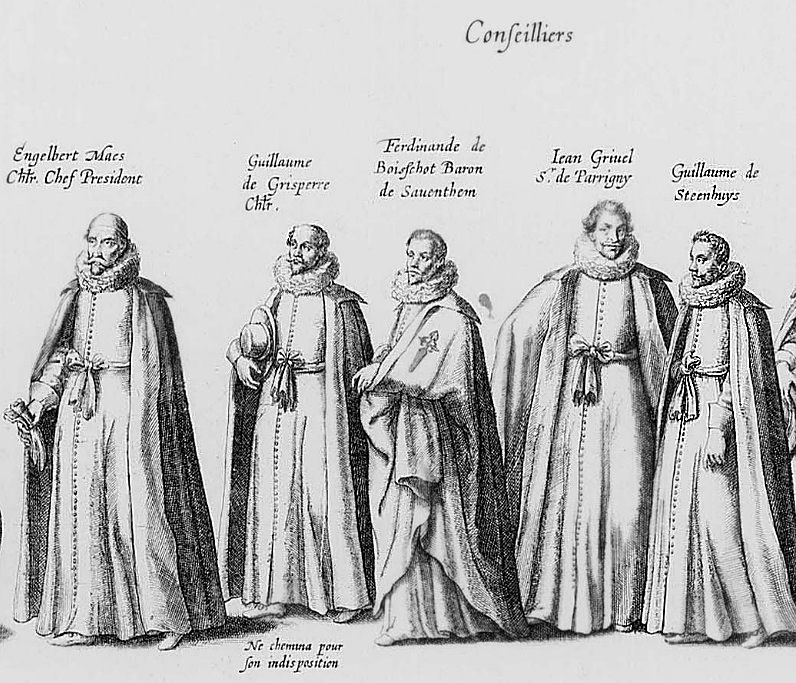
Members of the Privy Council during the solemn Funeral of Albert VII of Austria

The sheer burden of variety of bishoprics and independent cities, the intensely local partisanship, the various taxation systems, weights and measures, internal customs barriers, fiercely defended local rights were all hindrances to a "good Valois". Attempts at enlarging personal control by the dukes resulted in revolts among the independent towns (sometimes supported by independent local nobles) and bloody military suppression in response. An increasingly modernized central government, with a bureaucracy of clerks, allowed the dukes to become celebrated art patrons and establish a glamorous court life that gave rise to conventions of behavior that lasted for centuries. Philip the Good (1419–1467) extended his personal control to the southeast; bringing Brussels, Namur and Liège under his control. He channeled the traditional independence of the cities through such mechanisms as the first Estates-General, and consolidating of the region's economy.

The first Estates General of the Burgundian territories met in the City Hall of Bruges on 9 January 1464. It included delegates from the Duchy of Brabant, the County of Flanders, Lille, Douai and Orchies, the County of Artois, the County of Hainaut, the County of Holland, the County of Zeeland, the County of Namur, the Lordship of Mechelen, and the Boulonnais. Up to 1464, the Duke only maintained ties with each of the provincial States separately. In principle, the provincial Estates were composed of representatives of the three traditional estates: clergy, nobility and the Third Estate, but the exact composition and influence of each estate (within the provincial Estates) could differ. Convening an Estates General in which all provincial Estates were represented was part of Philip the Good's policy of centralisation.

== Ducal patronage ==
From 1441, Philip based his ducal court in Brussels, but Bruges was the world center of commerce, though by the 1480s the inevitable silting of its harbor was bringing its economic hegemony to a close. Philip was a great patron of illuminated manuscripts and court painting reached new highs: Robert Campin, the Van Eyck brothers, and Rogier van der Weyden.

== Legacy ==
The Burgundian inheritance in the Low Countries consisted of numerous fiefs held by the Dukes of Burgundy in modern-day Belgium, Netherlands, Luxembourg, and in parts of France and Germany. Given that the dukes of Burgundy lost Burgundy proper to the Kingdom of France in 1477, and were never able to recover it, while retaining Charolais and the Free County of Burgundy, they moved their court to the Low Countries. The Burgundian Low Countries were ultimately expanded to include Seventeen Provinces under Emperor Charles V. The Burgundian inheritance then passed to the Spanish branch of the Habsburgs under King Philip II of Spain, whose rule was contested by the Dutch revolt, and fragmented into the Spanish Netherlands and the Dutch republic. Following the War of the Spanish Succession, the Spanish Netherlands passed to Austria and remained in Austrian hands until the French conquest of the late 18th century. The Bourbon Restoration did not re-establish the Burgundian states, with the former Burgundian territories remaining divided between France, the Netherlands and, following the Belgian Revolution, modern-day Belgium.

Politically, the Burgundian and Habsburg periods were of tremendous importance to the Dutch, as the various Dutch fiefs were now united politically into one single entity. The period ended in great turmoil, as the rise of Protestantism, the centralist policies of the Habsburg Empire, and other factors resulted in the Dutch Revolt and the Eighty Years' War.

=== Social and economic ===
In 1491 and 1492, the peasants revolted in some areas. They were suppressed by Maximilian's forces under the command of Duke Albert of Saxony at a battle at Heemskerk.

== See also ==
- Burgundian State
- Seventeen Provinces

== Sources ==
- Blockmans, Wim; Prevenier, Walter (1999). The Promised Lands: The Low Countries Under Burgundian Rule, 1369–1530. Philadelphia: University of Pennsylvania Press. ISBN 0-8122-1382-3.
- Haemers, Jelle (2009). For the Common Good: State Power and Urban Revolts in the Reign of Mary of Burgundy (1477-1482). Turnhout: Brepols. ISBN 978-2-503-52986-8.
- Potter, David L. (1995). A History of France, 1460–1560: The Emergence of a Nation. Basingstoke: Macmillan. ISBN 978-0-333-54123-4.
- Prevenier, Walter; Blockmans, Wim (1986). The Burgundian Netherlands. New York: Cambridge University Press. ISBN 978-90-6153-155-5.
- Stein, Robert (2017). Magnanimous Dukes and Rising States: The Unification of the Burgundian Netherlands, 1380–1480. Oxford: Oxford University Press. ISBN 978-0-19-875710-8.
