= Treaty of Arras (1482) =

1482 treaty between the Holy Roman Empire and France

War of the Burgundian Succession (1477-1482-1493) Taken by France in 1477 Kept by Habsburgs, and secured in 1482, by the Treaty of Arras Returned to Habsburgs in 1493, by the Treaty of Senlis Domains of John II, Count of Nevers

The Treaty of Arras was concluded at Arras on 23 December 1482 between King Louis XI of France and Archduke Maximilian I of Austria. It ended the first phase of the War of the Burgundian Succession, which had broken out in 1477 over the Burgundian inheritance, a collection of Valois-Burgundy domains that included the Burgundian Netherlands and several other possessions of the House of Valois-Burgundy.

== Context ==
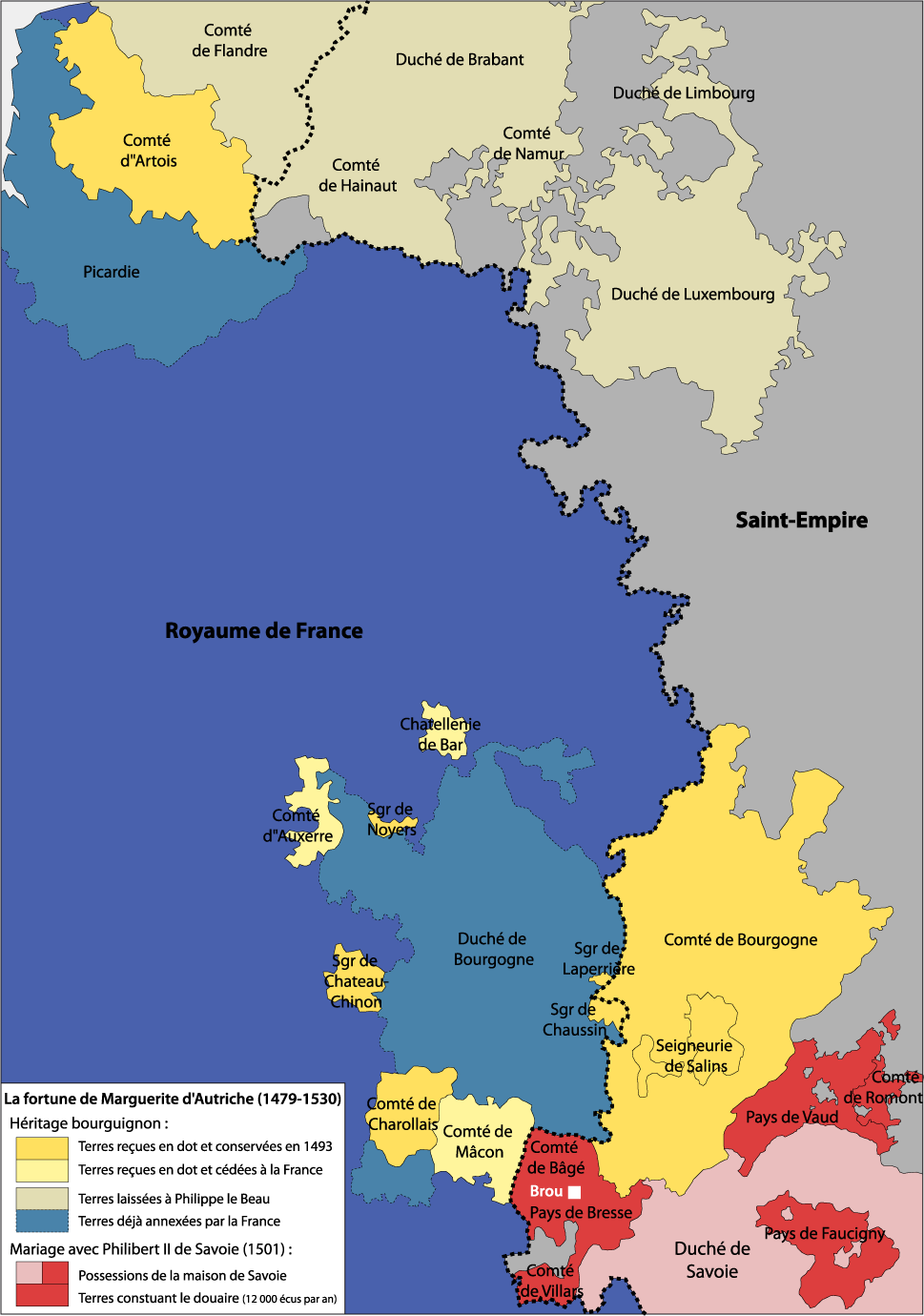
Margaret's dowry, as defined in 1482, and redistributed in 1493

The dukes from the House of Valois-Burgundy, a cadet branch of the French royal House of Valois, had ruled over a significant amount of territories on both sides of the border between the Kingdom of France and the Holy Roman Empire. When the last Burgundian duke, Charles the Bold, died at the Battle of Nancy on 5 January 1477 and left no sons, his daughter Mary of Burgundy claimed all of her father's lands.

That was opposed by the French king, who decided to take possession over those domains of the late duke that belonged to the French realm, including Duchy of Burgundy, County of Vermandois, County of Boulogne, County of Artois, County of Flanders and some other regions. Those provinces were claimed by the French crown as reverted fiefs and successfully seized (except Flanders).

In order to secure her inheritance, Mary of Burgundy decided to marry Archduke Maximilian of Austria, as had been agreed in 1476 between her father, Charles, and Emperor Frederick III, the father of Maximilian. The marriage took place on 19 August 1477, and since Maximilian did not hesitate to defend the heritage of his wife, the conflict with France escalated and culminated in the 1479 Battle of Guinegate in which he defeated the troops of King Louis XI. However, after Mary of Burgundy died on 27 March 1482, leaving her inheritance to their son Philip, Maximilian had to cope with difficulties to prevail as an accepted regent for his young son.

== Terms ==
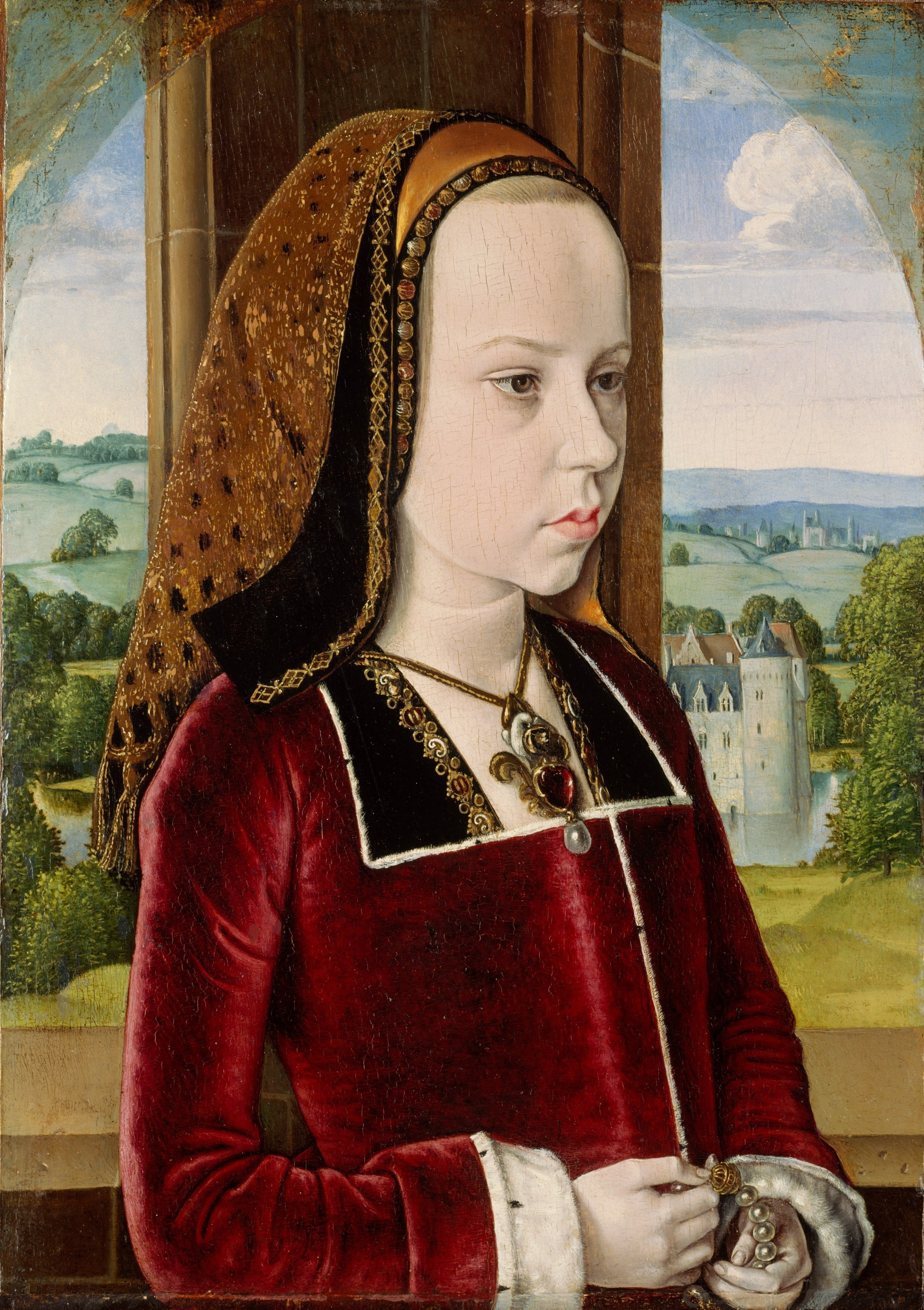
Portrait of young Archduchess Margaret of Austria at about ten by Jean Hey (c. 1490)

To settle the conflict, the Treaty of Arras was concluded on 23 December 1482. Acting on behalf of his son Philip, Maximilian agreed to betroth his young daughter and Philip's sister, Archduchess Margaret of Austria, to the young Dauphin of France, the later King Charles VIII. Their marriage was thus agreed in principle, but its formal conclusion was set for the future because Margaret was not even three years old. The marital agreement was used to settle territorial disputes by defining several contested lands as the Margaret's dowry.

Those domains were, in alphabetical order:

- County of Artois
- County of Auxerre
- County of Burgundy
- County of Charolais
- County of Mâcon
- Lordships of Bar-sur-Seine, Château-Chinon, Chaussin, Laperrière, Noyers and Salins.

All of those lands were already taken by France in 1477, and that reality was diplomatically acknowledged by defining them as parts of Margaret's dowry, thus leaving them effectively in French hands. On the other side, the affluent County of Flanders and all of the other north-eastern domains in the Burgundian Netherlands were left to Philip. The question of the Duchy of Burgundy and several Picardian counties was not addressed formally by the treaty, which thus left those territories in French possession.

== Legacy ==
Following the ratification of the treaty, the betrothal of Margaret to Charles was formalized in 1483. The young fiance of the Dauphin came to live at the French court, and the territorial clauses of the treaty were put in effect. In the same year, upon his father's death, Charles became the new king of France. However, in 1491, the engagement was renounced by the French side since Charles decided to marry Duchess Anne of Brittany. Thus, the question of possession over lands belonging to Margaret's dowry was reopened, which led to new disputes that were resolved in 1493 by the Treaty of Senlis.

== See also ==
- History of Flanders
- History of Burgundy
- Burgundian Circle
- Habsburg Netherlands
- Spanish Netherlands
- Seventeen Provinces

== Sources ==
- Headley, John M. (1983). The Emperor and His Chancellor: A Study of the Imperial Chancellery Under Gattinara. New York: Cambridge University Press.
- Parker, Geoffrey (2019). Emperor: A New Life of Charles V. New Haven and London: Yale University Press.
- Picot, Émile; Stein, Henri (1923). Recueil de pièces historiques imprimées sous le règne de Louis XI. Vol. 1. Paris: Société des bibliophiles françois.
- Potter, David L. (1995). A History of France, 1460–1560: The Emergence of a Nation. Basingstoke: Macmillan.
- Prevenier, Walter; Blockmans, Wim (1986). The Burgundian Netherlands. New York: Cambridge University Press.
- Saenger, Paul (1977). "Burgundy and the Inalienability of Appanages in the Reign of Louis XI". French Historical Studies. 10 (1): 1–26.
- Stein, Robert (2017). Magnanimous Dukes and Rising States: The Unification of the Burgundian Netherlands, 1380–1480. Oxford: Oxford University Press.
