= County of Artois =

Historic province of the Kingdom of France

Coordinates: 50°30′N 2°30′E

County of Artois Comté d'Artois (French) Graafschap Artesië (Dutch) Comitatus Artesiae (Latin)
- 1237–1659
- Flag Coat of arms

- County of Artois (1350)
- Status: Fiefdom of France, then state of the Holy Roman Empire (1493–1659)
- Capital: Arras (Atrecht)
- Common languages: Picard, Old Dutch, Middle Dutch, French
- Government: Feudal system
- Count of Artois
  - 1237–1250: Robert I (first)
  - 1404–1419: John the Fearless (last)
- Historical era: Middle Ages
  - To France as dowry: 28 April 1180
  - Count Robert I: 1237
  - Part of Burgundy: 1384
  - Passed to Habsburg: 1493
  - Joined Burgundian Circle: 1512
  - Reverted to France: 5 November 1659
Preceded by	Succeeded by
Kingdom of France	Kingdom of France; Burgundian Netherlands
- Today part of: France

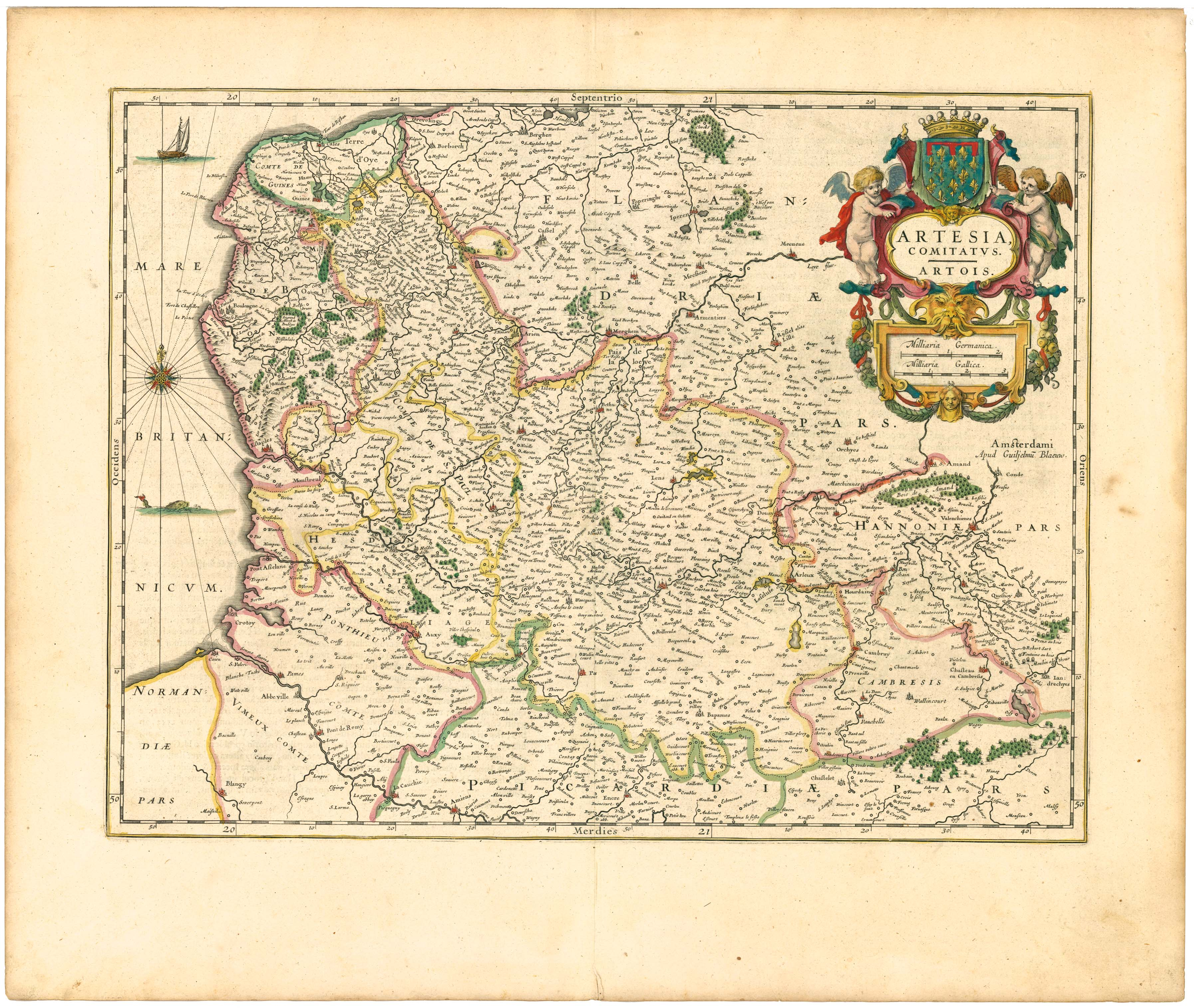
Blaeu: Artesia Comitatus, 1645

The County of Artois (French: comté d'Artois, Dutch: graafschap Artesië, Picard: Comté d'Artoé) was a historic province of the Kingdom of France, held by the Dukes of Burgundy from 1384 until 1477/82, and a state of the Holy Roman Empire from 1493 until 1659.

Present-day Artois lies in northern France, near the border with Belgium. Its territory has an area of around 4,000 square kilometres (1,500 sq mi) and a population of about one million. Its principal cities include Arras (Dutch: Atrecht), Calais (Dutch: Kales), Boulogne-sur-Mer (Dutch: Bonen), Saint-Omer (West Flemish: Sint-Omaars, Lens and Béthune. It forms the interior of the French département of Pas-de-Calais.

In northern Gaul the Belgic tribe of the Atrebates lived in the future area of Artois, the name of which (Latin: Atrebatia) reflects theirs. A Carolingian feudal county in its own right from the late 8th century, Artois was annexed by the County of Flanders (898 onwards). It came to France in 1180 as the dowry of a 10-year-old Flemish noblewoman, Isabelle of Hainaut, and was again made a separate county in 1237 for Robert, a grandson of Isabelle. Through inheritance, Artois once again came under the rule of the counts of Flanders in 1384, this time as part of a large agglomeration of low country territories held by the dukes of Burgundy and their heirs the Habsburg kings of Spain. Artois briefly joined in the Dutch Revolt in 1576, participating in the alliance of the Pacification of Ghent until it became a member of the Union of Arras in 1579.

After the Union, Artois and Hainaut (Dutch: Henegouwen) reached a separate agreement with Philip II of Spain. Artois remained part of the Spanish Netherlands until it was conquered by the French during the Thirty Years War of 1618–1648. The annexation was acknowledged in the Treaty of the Pyrenees in 1659, and Artois became a French province.

== Location ==
Artois occupies the interior of the Pas-de-Calais département, the western part of which constitutes the former Boulonnais. Artois roughly corresponds to the arrondissements of Arras, Béthune, Saint Omer, and Lens, and the eastern part of the arrondissement of Montreuil. It occupies the western end of the coalfield which stretches eastward through the neighbouring Nord département and across central Belgium.

== History ==
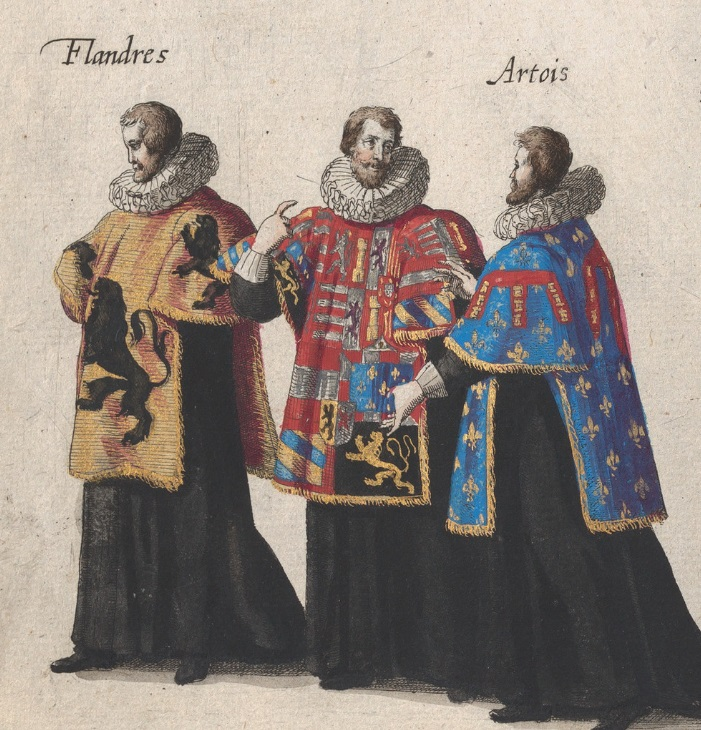
Pompa Funebris Albert VII in Brussels

At the time of Julius Caesar, Artois was the country of the Atrebates, one of the tribes he referred to as Belgae. Their capital, Nemetocenna (later also called Nemetacum or Nemetacon too, all believed to have originated from the Celtic word nemeton, meaning 'sacred space'), is now the city of Arras, which possibly took its later name from the old name of the region. Under the Roman Empire the region became a civitas within the Roman province of Belgica.

As Roman power waned, the civitas continued to exist as the original basis of the Christian Diocese of Arras. Under the Franks the region became a Carolingian jurisdiction (comitatus) within West Francia. A lordship was established by the counts Odalric and Ecfrid of Artois; its territories from 898 on were integrated into the County of Flanders by Count Baldwin II, completed by his son and successor Count Arnulf I.

A new territorial principality of Artois was established in 1180 by the division of the county of Flanders as a dowry given by the Flemish count Philip of Alsace to his niece Isabelle of Hainaut at the time of her marriage to King Philip II of France. Upon Isabelle's death in 1190, it was claimed as a reverted fief by the French crown, which, however, met with strong opposition by Flanders. The French crown prince Louis VIII the Lion, who had inherited the title of Count of Artois from his mother Isabelle, campaigned in Flemish lands and captured Count Ferrand at the Battle of Bouvines in 1214, thereby acquiring the county for the French House of Capet, which was confirmed by the 1226 Treaty of Melun.

In 1237, King Louis VIII gave the County of Artois as an appanage to his younger son Robert, who thereby became the progenitor of the House of Artois, a cadet branch of the Capetian dynasty. After the death of his heir Count Robert II at the Battle of the Golden Spurs in 1302, a succession dispute arose between Robert's daughter, Countess Mahaut and her nephew Robert III, who represented the claim of his father Philip, who had died after the Battle of Furnes in 1298. The dispute was settled in favour of Mahaut. Upon her death in 1329, Artois passed to her daughter by the Anscarid count Otto IV of Burgundy, Countess Joan II. Joan II had inherited the County of Burgundy (Franche-Comté) in 1315 and when she died in 1330, she bequested Artois and Franche-Comté to her eldest daughter, Joan III.

Joan III, Countess of Artois and Burgundy, entered into the dynastic allegiance with the ducal House of Burgundy, a cadet branch of the royal Capetians, by marrying Odo IV of Burgundy in 1330. Until 1350 all territories of Artois, Franche-Comté and the Burgundian duchy were inherited by their grandson Philip I of Burgundy. Upon Philip's death in 1361, however, Artois reverted to the second daughter of Joan, Margaret, and after her death once again to Flanders, which was now itself ruled by her son, Count Louis II in 1382. In 1384 all Flanders, Artois and Franche-Comté finally became part of the vast, complex territory of the Duchy of Burgundy, as Louis' daughter and heiress Margaret III had married Duke Philip the Bold in 1369.

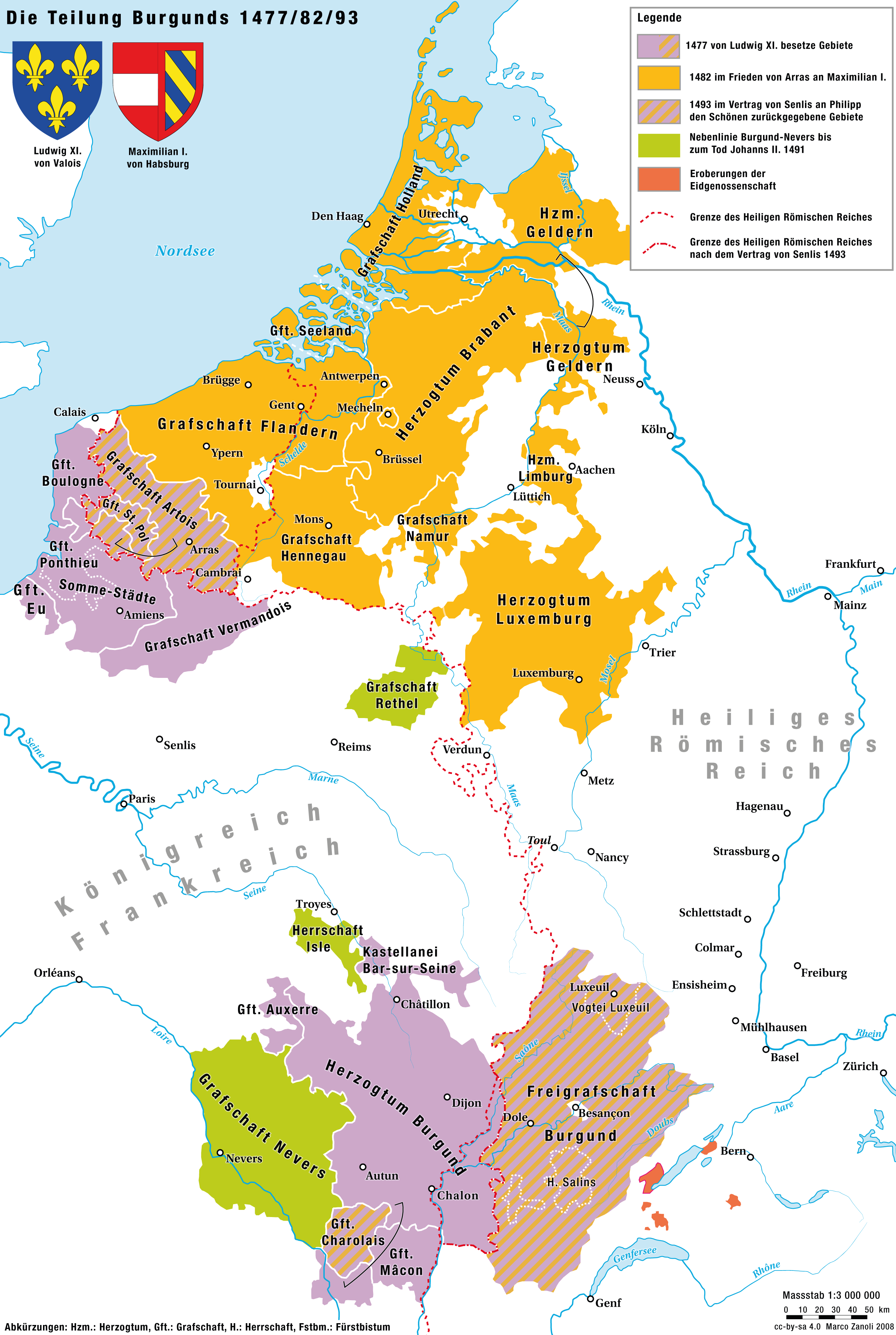
War of the Burgundian Succession (1477-1482-1493) Taken by France in 1477 Kept by Mary of Burgundy, and secured her son Philip, by the Treaty of Arras (1482) Returned to Philip in 1493, by the Treaty of Senlis Domains of John II, Count of Nevers

Artois was then held by Philip's descendants from the Burgundian House of Valois-Burgundy until the death of Duke Charles the Bold at the Battle of Nancy on 5 January 1477. Since Charles left no sons, his daughter Mary of Burgundy claimed all of her fathers lands. That was opposed by King Louis XI, who decided to take possession over Artois and other domains of the late Duke that were situated within borders of the French realm. Upon seizing the county, a royal seneschalty was established in Artois.

In order to secure her claims, Mary of Burgundy married Archduke Maximilian I of Austria, the son of Emperor Frederick III, thus providing support for her cause, and also achieving solid control over several north-eastern provinces. Maximilian's and Louis' troops met at the 1479 Battle of Guinegate. Maximilian's forces were victorious, but Artois remained in the Franch hands. Mary died in 1482, and her claims passed to her son Philip, who was still a child and thus under the guardianship of his father Maximilian.

To settle the conflict, the Treaty of Arras was concluded on 23 December 1482. Maximilian agreed to betroth his young daughter and Philip's sister Margaret, to the young Dauphin of France, the later King Charles VIII. The marital agreement was devised as an instrument for settling territorial disputes, by defining the County of Artois and several other contested lands as the Margaret's dowry, thus leaving them in the effective French possession.

In 1493, by the Treaty of Senlis, France ceded those territories (including Artois) to Philip, whose father Maximilian was now the Holy Roman Emperor. Since 1512, Artois was included in the Burgundian Circle, within the Holy Roman Empire. It was one of the Seventeen Provinces of the Habsburg Netherlands, and from 1556 was held by Habsburg Spain. In 1579 Artois together with Hainaut and Walloon Flanders signed the Union of Arras loyal to the Spanish Habsburgs, while in reaction the seven northern provinces of the Spanish Netherlands formed the Union of Utrecht, the precursor of the Dutch Republic. Artois in the course of the Franco-Spanish War was conquered by the troops of King Louis XIII in 1640 and reverted to French rule by the 1659 Treaty of the Pyrenees.

The title of Count of Artois was used only once more, for Charles-Philippe (1757–1836), grandson of King Louis XV, until he ascended as King Charles X in 1824.

== Sources ==
- Goethals-Vercruysse, Jacques Joseph Ignace; Voisin, Auguste (1834), Bataille de Courtrai, ou des Eperons d'Or (in French), Vanderheyden D. J.
- Parker, Geoffrey (2019). Emperor: A New Life of Charles V. New Haven and London: Yale University Press.
- Potter, David L. (1995). A History of France, 1460–1560: The Emergence of a Nation. Basingstoke: Macmillan.
- Prevenier, Walter; Blockmans, Wim (1986). The Burgundian Netherlands. New York: Cambridge University Press.
- Saenger, Paul (1977). "Burgundy and the Inalienability of Appanages in the Reign of Louis XI". French Historical Studies. 10 (1): 1–26.
- Stein, Robert (2017). Magnanimous Dukes and Rising States: The Unification of the Burgundian Netherlands, 1380–1480. Oxford: Oxford University Press.
- Vanderkindere, Léon (1902), La Formation territoriale des principautés belges au Moyen Âge (PDF) (in French), vol. 1, Brussels: H. Lamertin
