= Jean Dumont (publicist) =

French writer and historian (1667–1727)

Jean Dumont Baron de Carlscroon (13 January 1667 – 13 May 1727) was a French writer and historian. He followed the profession of arms but, not obtaining promotion so rapidly as he expected, he left the service and travelled through different parts of Europe. He stopped in Holland with the intention of publishing an account of his travels. But in the interval, at the request of his bookseller, he wrote and published several pamphlets, which were eagerly sought after, owing to the unceremonious manner in which he treated the ministry of France. Thus deprived of all hope of employment in his own country, he thought of forming a permanent establishment in Holland, and accordingly commenced a course of lectures on public law. The project succeeded far beyond his expectations and some useful compilations which he published in the same period made him well known in other countries. The emperor appointed him his historiographer, and some time afterwards conferred on him the title of Baron de Carlscroon. He died in Vienna.

Dumont was also the author of Lettres historiques contenant ce qui se passe de plus important en Europe. This periodical, begun in 1692 with two volumes appearing annually, he edited until 1710, when it was continued by Jacques Basnage and others until 1728. The earlier volumes are much prized.

== Publications ==
- Dumont, J.; Rousset de Missy, J. (1729). Histoire militaire du prince Eugene de Savoye, du prince et duc de Marlborough, et du prince de Nassau-Frise. Trois tômes (in French). La Haye: Isaac van der Kloot.
- Voyages en France, en Italie, en Allemagne, a Malte, et en Turquie (Hague, 1699, 4 vols.)
- Mémoires politiques pour servir a la parfaite intelligence de l'histoire de la Paix de Ryswick (Hague, 1699, 4 vols.)
- Recherches modestes des causes de la presente guerre, en ce qui concerne les Provinces Unies (1713)
- Recueil de traites d'alliance, du pai, et de commerce entre les rois, princes, et etats, depuis la Paix de Munster (Amsterdam, 1710, 2 vols.)
- Soupirs du l'Europe et la rue du projet de paix contenu dans la harangue de la reine de la Grande-Bretagne (1712)
- Corps universel diplomatique du droit des gens, contenant un recueil des traités de paix, d'alliance, &c., faits en Europe, depuis Charlemagne jusqu'à present (Amsterdam, 1726, and following years, 8 vols. fol., continued after Dumonts death by J. Rousset)
- Batailles gagnees par le Prince Eugene de Savoie (Hague, 1723)
