= Briquet =

Briquet may refer to:

== People named Briquet ==
- Briquet (possibly Jehan de Villeroye) fl. early 15th century, an early Renaissance composer
- Charles-Moïse Briquet (1880–1918), Swiss paper merchant and scholar of watermarks
- Fortunée Briquet (1782–1815), French femme de lettres
- John Briquet (1870–1931), Swiss botanist
- Paul Briquet (1796–1881), French psychiatrist
- Robert Briquet (14th century), mercenary captain during the Hundred Years' War

== Other ==
- Artois Hound or Briquet, a rare breed of dog, and a descendant of the Bloodhound
- Briquet (coin), a medieval silver coin
- Briquette or briquet, a block of flammable matter which is used as fuel to start and maintain a fire
- Briquet's, a famous 19th century private school at Plain Palais, Geneva, Switzerland
- Sabre, a sword with a curved, single-edged blade and a rather large hand guard, often carried in past centuries by infantrymen and artillerymen
- A type of sandwich
