= Briquet (coin) =

Briquet is a medieval silver coin introduced in 1474 by Burgundy rulers

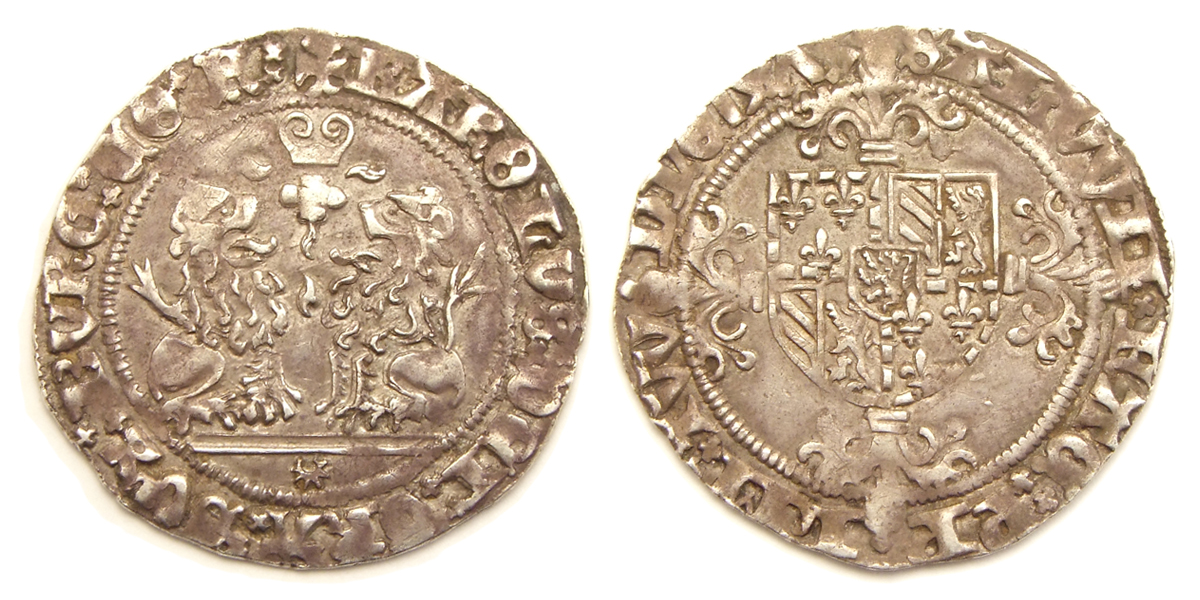
Charles the Bold, double briquet, struck Bruges 1475. Obverse: Two lions rampant combatant, fire-steel (briquet) above. Reverse: Shield of Burgundy over floriated cross

A briquet (Dutch: vuurijzer) is a medieval silver coin, first introduced by Charles the Bold, Duke of Burgundy in 1474 (2nd Emission – Coinage Act of 27 October 1474). The last briquet was struck under Philip the Handsome (6th Emission – Coinage Act of 16 March 1492). The name briquet refers to the fire steel or flint which was chosen by Philip the Good as a personal emblem. The flint was such a favourite Burgundian symbol that it has been used on many coins struck by the successors of Philip the Good, and was used in the chain of the Order of the Golden Fleece.

A single briquet was introduced with a value of one stuiver, other issues were a double and half briquet.

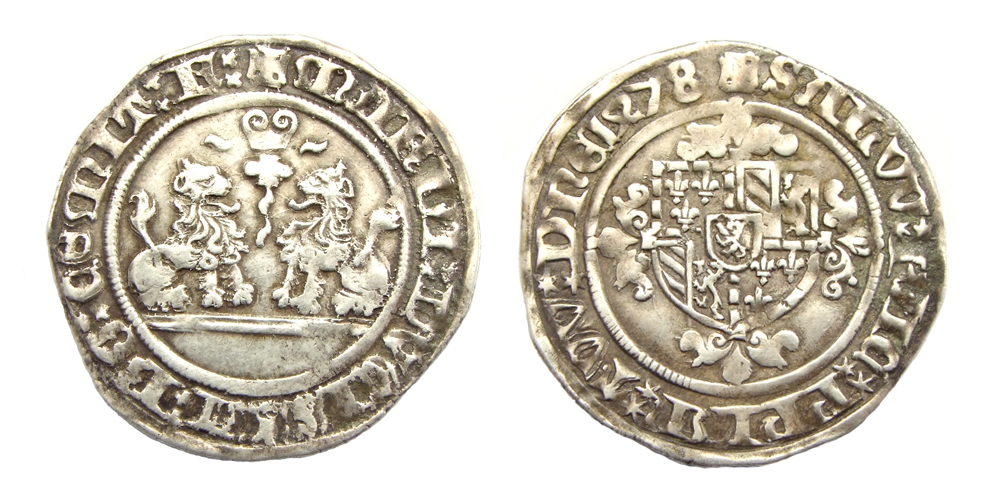
Double briquet, struck in 1478 under Mary of Burgundy. Obverse: Two lions rampant combatant, fire-steel (briquet) above. Reverse: Shield of Burgundy over floriated cross
