= Legacy of Maximilian I, Holy Roman Emperor =

Impact of Emperor from 1508 to 1519

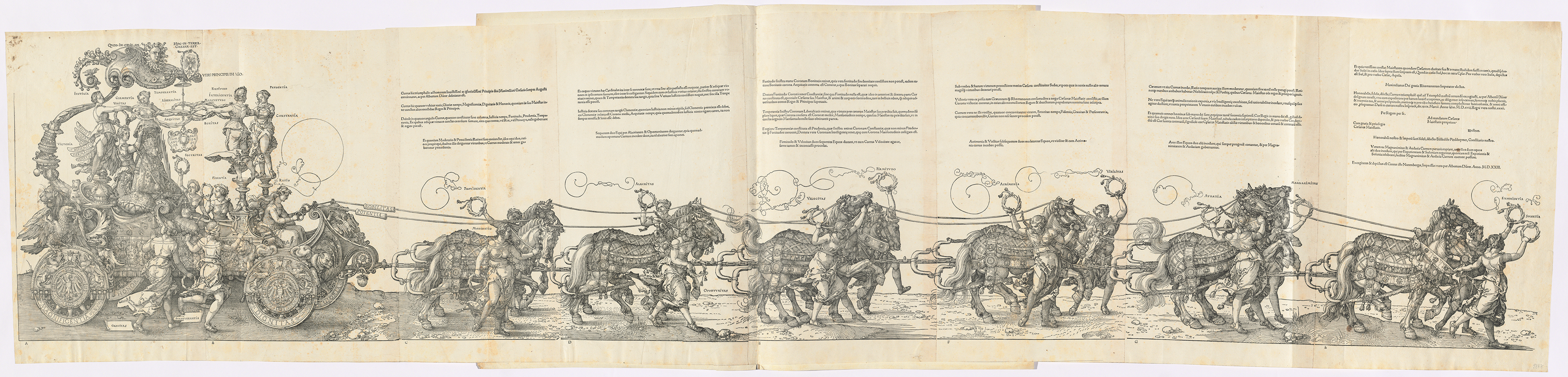
The Triumphal Chariot of Maximilian I, by Albrecht Dürer. The canopy is adorned with the solar symbol and the imperial coat-of-arms. The inscription states: "That which the sun is in the heavens, the Emperor is on earth."

The legacy of Maximilian I, Holy Roman Emperor has had many effects on the world. Despite his reputation as "the last knight" (and his penchant for personally commanding battles and leading a peripatetic court), as a politician, Maximilian also carried out "herculean tasks of bureaucracy" every day of his adult life (the emperor boasted that he could dictate, simultaneously, to half a dozen secretaries). At the same time, James M. Bradburne remarks that, "Naturally every ruler wanted to be seen as a victor, but Maximilian aspired to the role of Apollo Musagetes." The circle of humanists gathered around him and other contemporary admirers also tended to depict him as such. Maximilian was a universal patron, whose intellect and imagination, according to historian Sydney Anglo, made the courtier of Castiliogne look like a scaled-down version. Anglo points out, though, that the emperor treated his artists and scholars like mere tools (whom he also tended to fail to pay adequately or timely) to serve his purposes, and never autonomous forces. Maximilian did not play the roles of the sponsor and commissioner only, but as organizer, stimulator and planner, he joined the creative processes, drew up the programmes, suggested improvements, checked and decided on the details, invented devices, almost regardless of the time and material resources required. His creativity was not limited to the practical issues of politics, economy and war, but extended to the areas of arts, sciences, hunting, fishing and especially technical innovations, inclụding the creation of all kinds of military equipment, fortifications, precious metal processing or the mining industry. These activities though were time-consuming and the effort the emperor poured in such activities was sometimes criticized as excessive, or that they distracted him from the main tasks of a ruler. In the nineteenth century and early twentieth century, some even criticized him for possessing the qualities that befitted a genius more than a ruler, or that his intellect that saw too far made him unwisely try to force the march of time.

== Military innovation, chivalry, and equipment ==
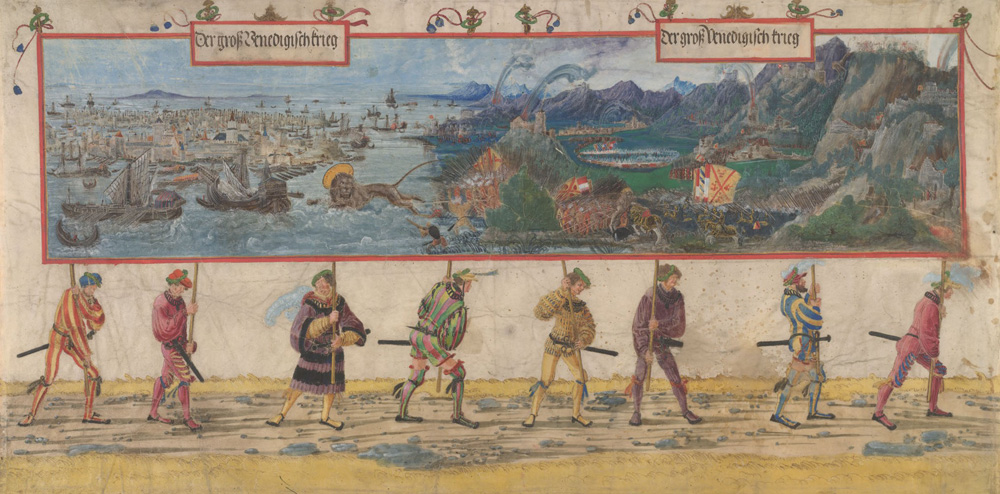
Albrecht Altdorfer's Der große Venezianische Krieg, which depicts the Landsknechte in Maximilian's triumphal procession – c. 1512–1515

Maximilian was a capable commander and a military innovator who contributed to the modernization of warfare, although he lost many wars, usually due to the lack of financial resources. The notable commentators of his time, including Machiavelli, Piero Vettori and Guicciardini rated him as a great general, or in the words of Machiavelli, "second to none", but pointed out that extravagance, terrible management of financial resources and other character defects tended to lead to the failures of grand schemes. According to Matthias Pfaffenbichler, he did not accept the truth that war depended on money, and thus the problem was that despite his military-tactical talents, he rarely managed to convert military victories into long-term political successes. He and his condottiero George von Frundsberg organized the first formations of the Landsknechte based on inspiration from Swiss pikemen, but increased the ratio of pikemen and favoured handgunners over the crossbowmen, with new tactics being developed, leading to improvement in performance. Discipline, drilling and a highly developed staff by the standard of the era were also instilled. The "war apparatus" he created later played an essential role in Austria's rank as great power. Maximilian was the founder and organiser of the arms industry of the Habsburgs. He started the standardization of the artillery (according to the weight of the cannonballs) and made them more mobile. He sponsored new types of cannons, initiated many innovations that improved the range and damage so that cannons worked better against thick walls, and concerned himself with the metallurgy, as cannons often exploded when ignited and caused damage among his own troops. According to contemporary accounts, he could field an artillery of 105 cannons, including both iron and bronze guns of various sizes. The artillery force is considered by some to be the most developed of the day. The arsenal in Innsbruck, created by Maximilian, was one of the most notable artillery arsenals in Europe. His typical tactic was: artillery should attack first, the cavalry would act as shock troops and attack the flanks, infantry fought in tightly knitted formation at the middle.

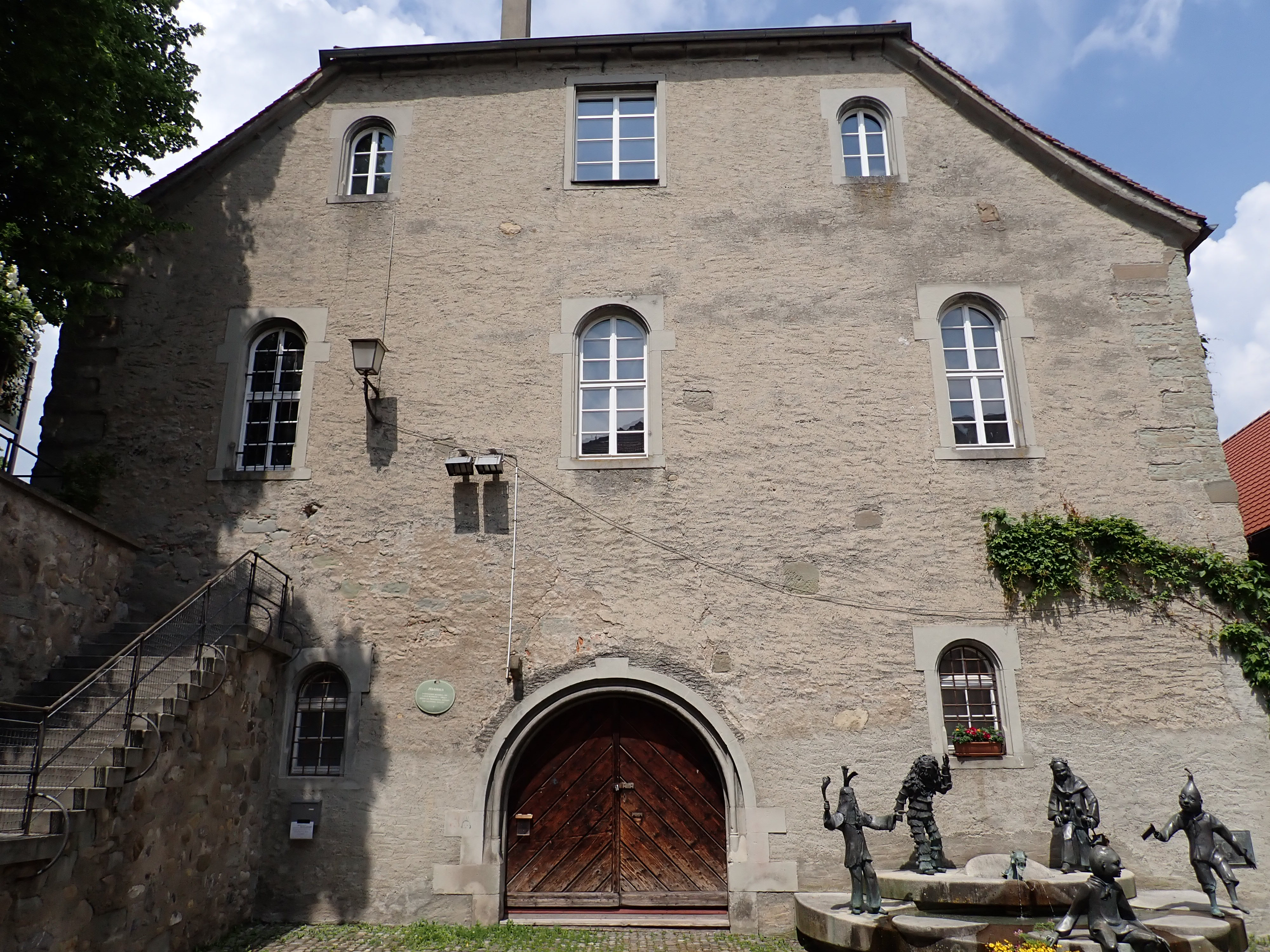
The arsenal in Lindau. The construction started in 1507 but only finished in 1526, after Maximilian's death.

A figure who contributed greatly to the development of the Innsbruck arsenal was Gregor Löffler. He entered Maximilian's service in 1513, following in the footsteps of his father Peter; his son Hans Christoph would also be the leading gunfounder in Europe. Löffler was the first gun master who became an arms manufacturer (who produced weapons on an industrial scale), and was also responsible for casting many of the statues in Maximilian's cenotaph. In addition to the central arsenal in Innsbruck, Maximilian built a chain of arsenals to protect his border: those in Sigmundskron and Trent against Italians, in Lindau against the Swiss, in Breisach against the French, in Vienna against the Hungarians, in Graz, Hochosterwitz, Laibach, Gorizia against the Turks and Venetians. In addition, there were the old Burgundian arsenals against France. On the other hand, Wilfried Tittmann stresses the central importance of the arms manufacturing center in Nuremberg (where the earliest handguns, which proved suitable for the field and export, were developed), not only concerning Maximilian's military system but also the early modern military revolution in general. Puype notices that Tittmann and Eugen Heer share the view that Maximilian's industrialization policy made Nuremberg "the metropole of the Upper German armament industry." Marius Mutz opines that Tittmann's demonstration of Nuremberg's importance is generally convincing, but that some of his points, notably that Hans Kalteisen (who served Maximilian and was Löffler's rival) had a Nuremberg origin or that developments in Innsbruck were based on Nuremberg's technology as well, are a bit overambitious.

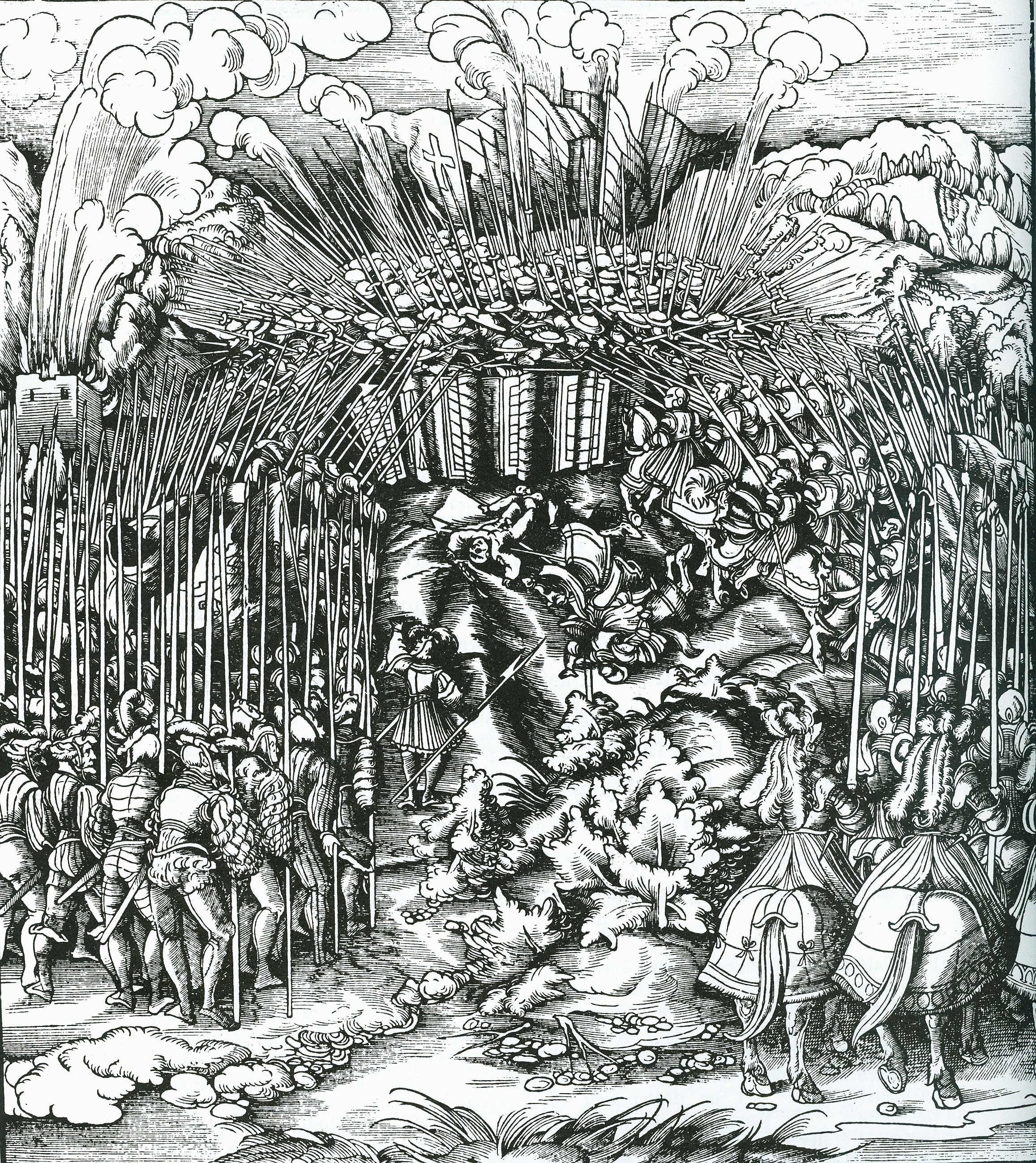
Behamisch facht (Bohemian battle) from the Weißkunig, Woodcut 175, depicting the Battle of Wenzenbach, one of the last knights' battles (1504), which was won by Maximilian and his ally Albert the Wise. In this battle, Maximilian was dragged from his horse by halberds, but rescued from being butchered by Erich von Braunschweig.

Maximilian was described by the nineteenth-century politician Anton Alexander Graf von Auersperg as "the last knight" (der letzte Ritter), and this epithet has stuck to him. Some historians note that the epithet rings true yet is ironic, because, as the father of the Landsknechte (of which the paternity he shared with George von Frundsberg) and "the first cannoneer of the nation", he ended the combat supremacy of the cavalry, and his death heralded the military revolution of the next two centuries. Moreover, his multifaceted reforms broke the back of the knight class both militarily and politically. He threw his own weight behind the promotion of the infantry soldier, leading them in battles on foot with a pike on his shoulder and giving the commanders honours and titles. To Maximilian, the rise of the new martial ethic including even its violent aspect—associated with the rise of the Landsknechte, was also an unextractable part of his own masculine identity. He believed that fighting alongside his foot soldiers legitimized his right to rule more than did any noble trapping or title. In his time, though, social tensions were brewing, and the nobles resisted this belief. At the Siege of Padua 1509, commanding a French-German allied army, Maximilian ordered the noble knights to dismount to help the Landsknechte to storm a breach, but Chevalier Bayard criticized him for putting noblemen at risk alongside "cobblers, blacksmiths, bakers, and laborers, and who do not hold their honor in like esteem as gentlemen." Even merely mixing the two on the same battlefield was considered insulting. The French then refused to obey. The siege broke when the German knights refused to continue their assaults on foot and demanded to fight on horseback, also on basis of status. A furious Maximilian left the camp and ordered the army to retreat.

With Maximilian's establishment and use of the Landsknechte, the military organisation in Germany was altered in a major way. Here began the rise of military enterprisers, who raised mercenaries with a system of subcontractors to make war on credit, and acted as the commanding generals of their own armies. Maximilian became an expert military enterpriser himself, leading his father to consider him a spendthrift military adventurer who wandered into new wars and debts while still recovering from the previous campaigns.

Regarding the cavalry, in 1500, using the French gendarmes as a model, he organized his heavy cavalry, called the kyrisser. These cavalrymen, still mostly noblemen, were still fully armed, but more lightly—these were the predecessors of cuirassiers. Non-nobles began to be accepted into the cavalry (mostly serving as light cavalry—each lanze, or lance, contained one kyrisser and six to seven light cavalrymen) and occasionally, he knighted them too. For heavy as well as light cavalry, firearms began to replace cold weapons.

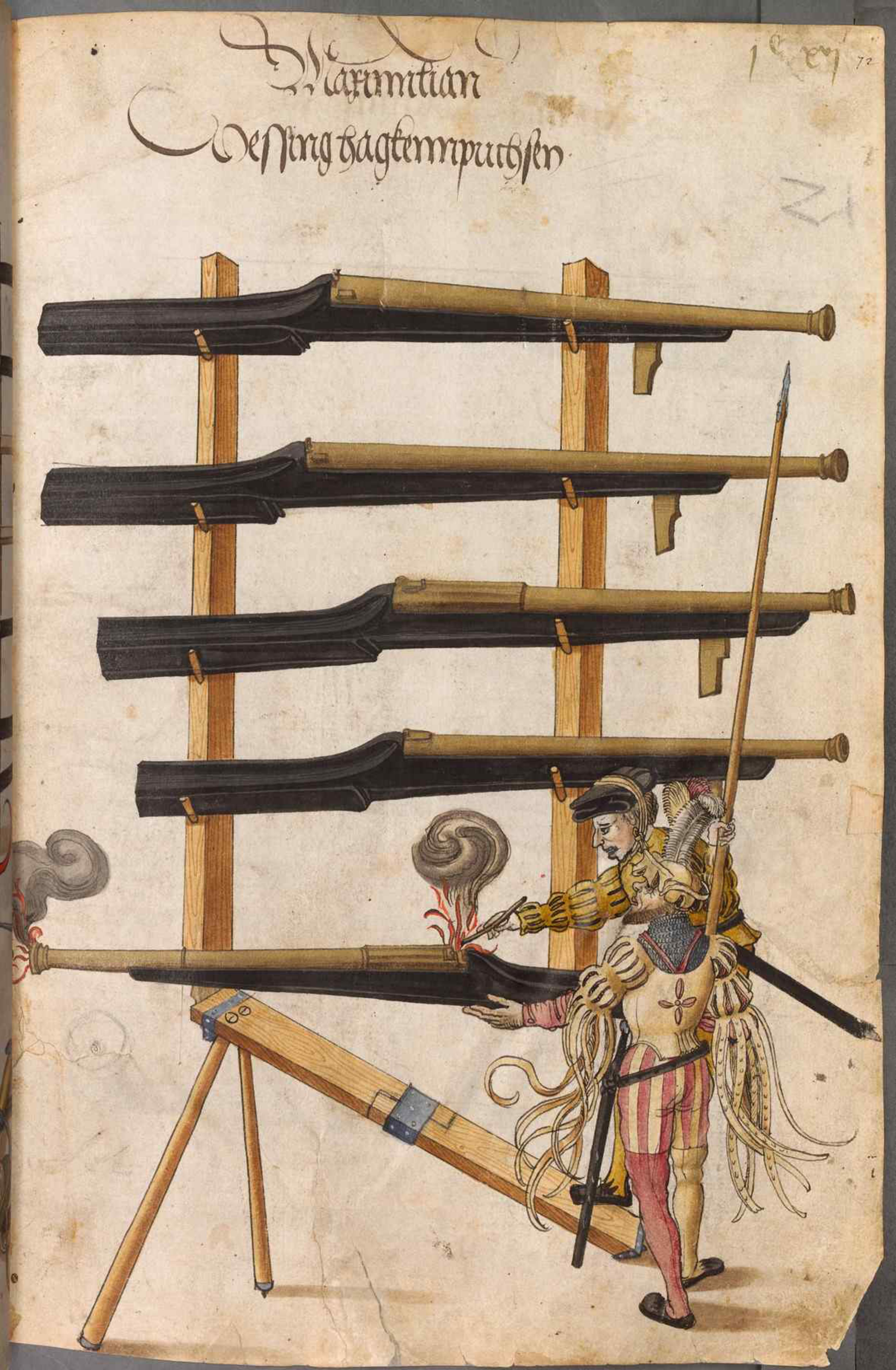
Great arquebus for two shooters, fol.72r. In battles, the main force of a Landskneckt regiment created a formation called Gewalthaufen. After the first encounter, those armed with melee weapons attacked the enemies at close range while arquebusiers moved in front or between various formations, while the artillery would be covered by the rear guards.

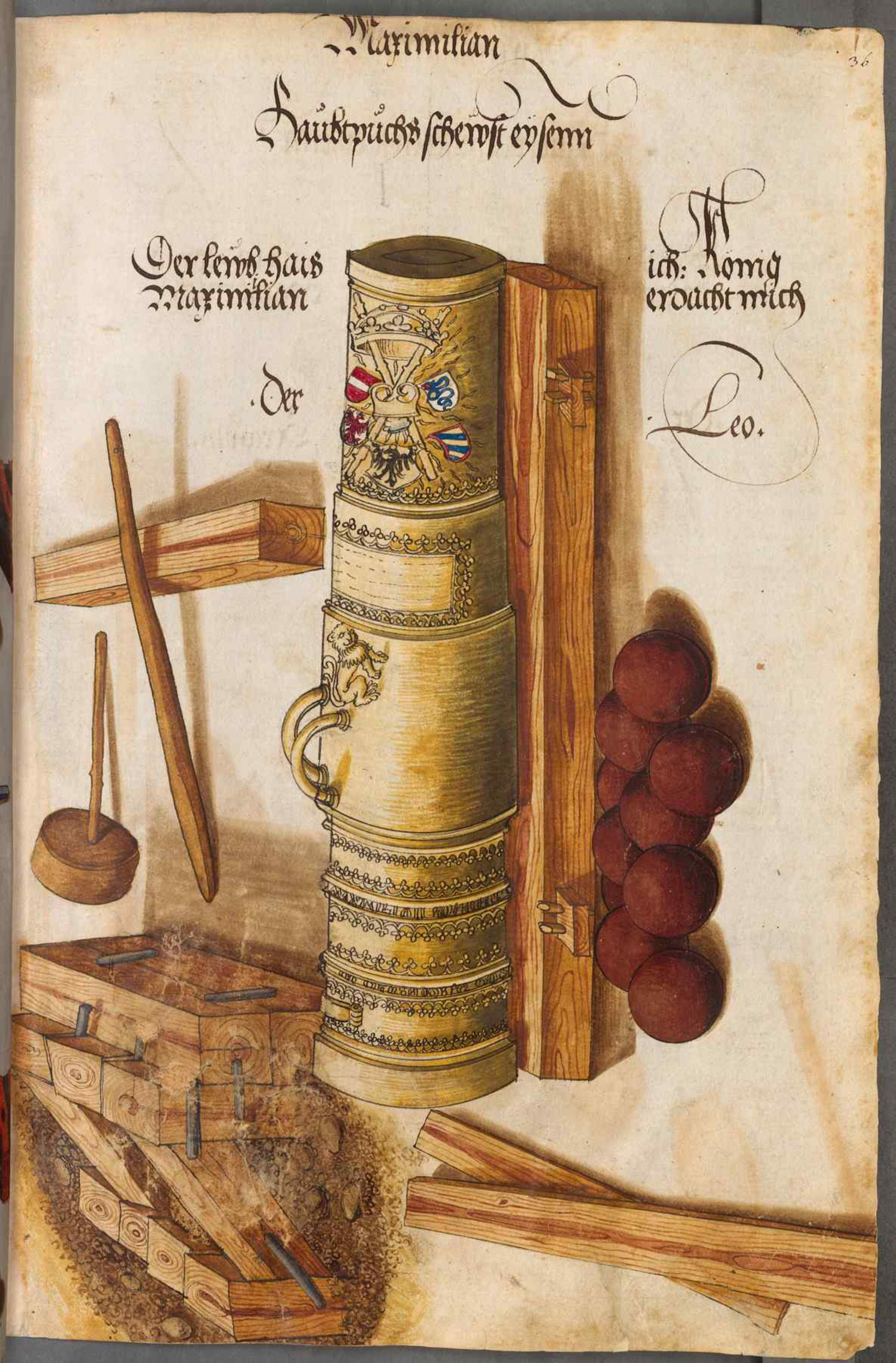
Hauptstück (main gun) Der Leo, used in the Siege of Kufstein (1504). Although one of the heaviest cannons, it failed to breach Kufstein's walls together with other cannons that shot stone balls. Only the Purlepaus and the Weckauf, the two largest cannons of the time, destroyed Kufstein almost all on their own with iron balls.

Images from Book of Armaments (Zeugbuch) of Maximilian

In military medicine, Maximilian introduced structured triage (triage itself had existed since the Ancient Egypt). It was in his armies that the wounded was first categorized and treated according to an order of priority—in times of war, higher priority was given to military personnel over civilians and the higher-ranked over the lower-ranked. The practice spread to other armies in the following centuries and coined "triage" by the French. During the Middle Age, European armies tended to bring with them workers who served the soldiers both as barbers (this was their chief function, thus the origin of their name in German, Feldscherer, or field shearer) and low-skilled paramedics (as opposed to a trained medicus) who worked on their external wounds. Beginning with Maximilian, each captain of a detachment (of 200–500 men) was compelled to bring a capable Feldscherer and provide him with medicine and equipments. These paramedics were subject to a level of control under a Oberfeldarzt (chief field doctor), although their organization was not stabilized until the seventeenth century and it also took a long time before the average level of these paramedics was raised substantially. The birth of the modern feldsher led to the formation of a military medical service, whose primary task, other than giving first aid, was to transport the wounded out of the battlefield as fast as possible with palanquins and wheelbarrows.

The emperor would not live to see the fruits of his military reforms, which were also widely adopted by the territories in the Empire and other nations in Europe. Moreover, the landsknechte's mode of fighting boosted the strength of the territorial polities, while more centralized nations were able to utilize them in ways German rulers could not. Kleinschmidt concludes that, in the end, Maximilian did good service to the competitors of his own grandson.

While favouring more modern methods in his actual military undertakings, Maximilian had a genuine interest in promoting chivalric traditions like the tournament, being an exceptional jouster himself. The tournaments helped to enhance his personal image and solidify a network of princes and nobles over whom he kept a close watch, fostering fidelity and fraternity among the competitors. Taking inspiration from the Burgundy tournament, he developed the German tournament into a distinctive entity. In addition, during at least two occasions in his campaigns, he challenged and killed French knights in duel-like preludes to battles.

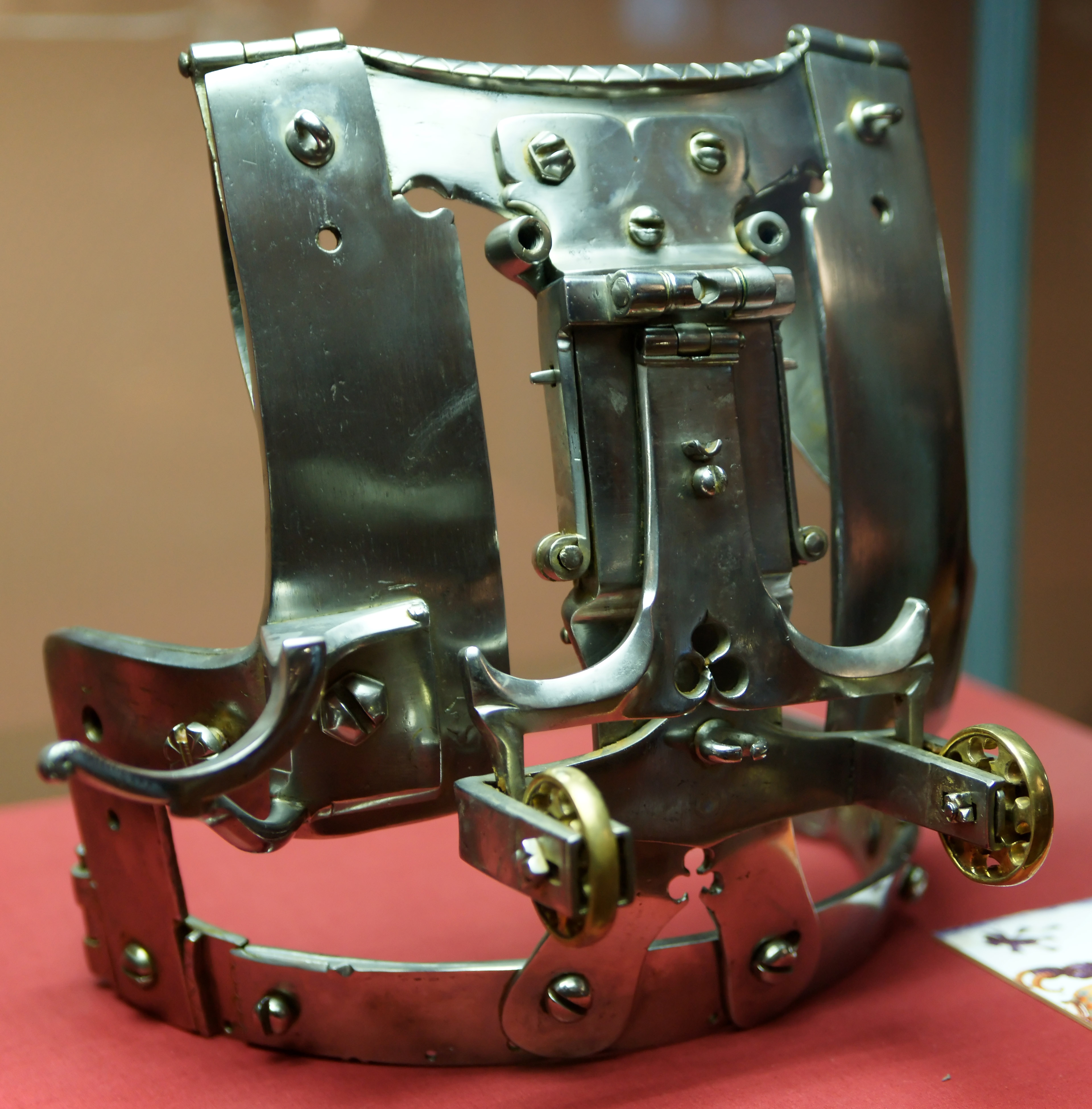
HJRK B 21 – Mechanical breastpiece used for Bundrennen, a tournament type which was probably only organized in the Imperial Court, c. 1490. Only three mechanical breastplates remain (one in Paris, two in Vienna). The breastplate was designed to carry a shield that, when hit properly, will be ejected over the jouster's head and burst apart, releasing triangle tin segments.

Knights reacted to their decreased condition and loss of privileges in different ways. Some asserted their traditional rights in violent ways and became robber knights like Götz von Berlichingen. The knights as a social group became an obstacle to Maximilian's law and order and the relationship between them and "the last knight" became antagonistic. Some probably also felt slighted by the way imperial propaganda presented Maximilian as the sole defender of knightly values. In the Diet of Worms in 1495, the emperor, the archbishops, great princes and free cities joined force to initiate the Perpetual Land Peace (Ewige Landfriede), forbidding all private feuding, in order to protect the rising tide of commerce. The tournament sponsored by the emperor was thus a tool to appease the knights, although it became a recreational, yet still deadly extreme sport. After spending 20 years creating and supporting policies against the knights though, Maximilian changed his ways and began trying to engage them to integrate them into his frame of rulership. In 1517, he lifted the ban on Franz von Sickingen, a leading figure among the knights and took him into his service. In the same year, he summoned the Rhenish knights and introduced his Ritterrecht (Knight's Rights), which would provide the free knight with a special law court, in exchange of their oaths for being obedient to the emperor and abstaining from evil deeds. He did not succeed in collecting taxes from them or creating a knights' association, but an ideology or frame emerged, that allowed the knights to retain their freedom while fostering the relationship between the crown and the sword.

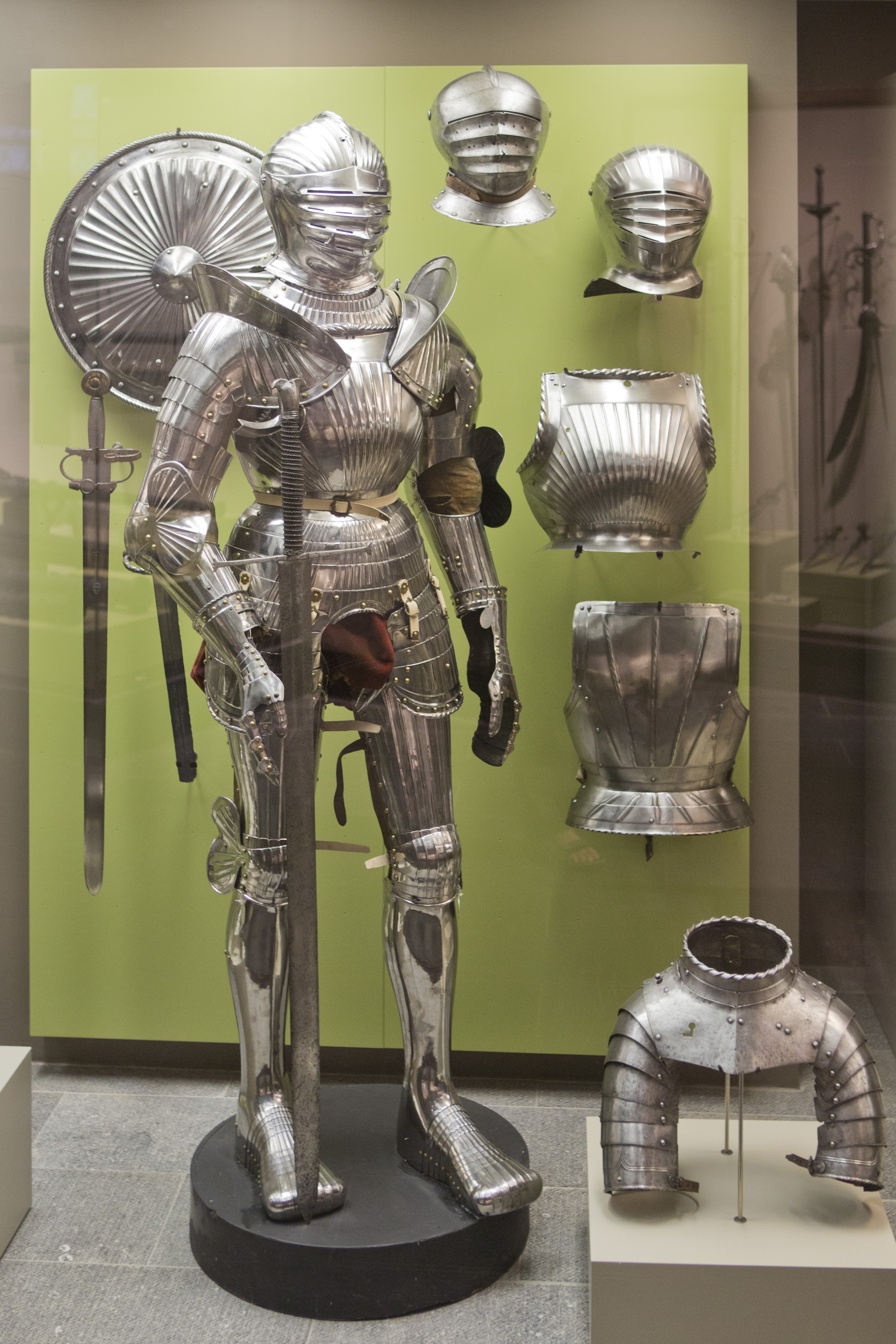
Maximilian armour, Royal Museum of the Armed Forces and Military History, Belgium

Maximilian had a great passion for armour, not only as equipment for battle or tournaments, but as an art form. He prided himself on his armor designing expertise and knowledge of metallurgy. Under his patronage, "the art of the armorer blossomed like never before." Master armorers across Europe like Lorenz Helmschmid, Konrad Seusenhofer, Franck Scroo and Daniel Hopfer (who was the first to etch on iron as part of an artistic process, using an acid wash) created custom-made armors that often served as extravagant gifts to display Maximilian's generosity and devices that would produce special effects (often initiated by the emperor himself) in tournaments. The style of armour that became popular during the second half of his reign featured elaborate fluting and metalworking, and became known as Maximilian armour. It emphasized the details in the shaping of the metal itself, rather than the etched or gilded designs popular in the Milanese style. Maximilian also gave a bizarre jousting helmet as a gift to King Henry VIII—the helmet's visor features a human face, with eyes, nose and a grinning mouth, and was modelled after the appearance of Maximilian himself. It also sports a pair of curled ram's horns, brass spectacles, and even etched beard stubble. Knowing that the extinct Treizsaurbeyn (likely Treitzsauerwein) family had a method to make extra tough armours that could not be shot through by any crossbow, he sought their servant Caspar Riederer, who helped Konrad Seusenhofer to recreate the armour type. With knowledge gained from Riederer, Maximilian invented a method "so that in his workshops 30 front and back plates could be made at once", in order to help his soldiers and especially his Landsknechte. The details of the process described are currently not known, but likely utilizing matrices with where armour parts could be stamped out from sheet metal.

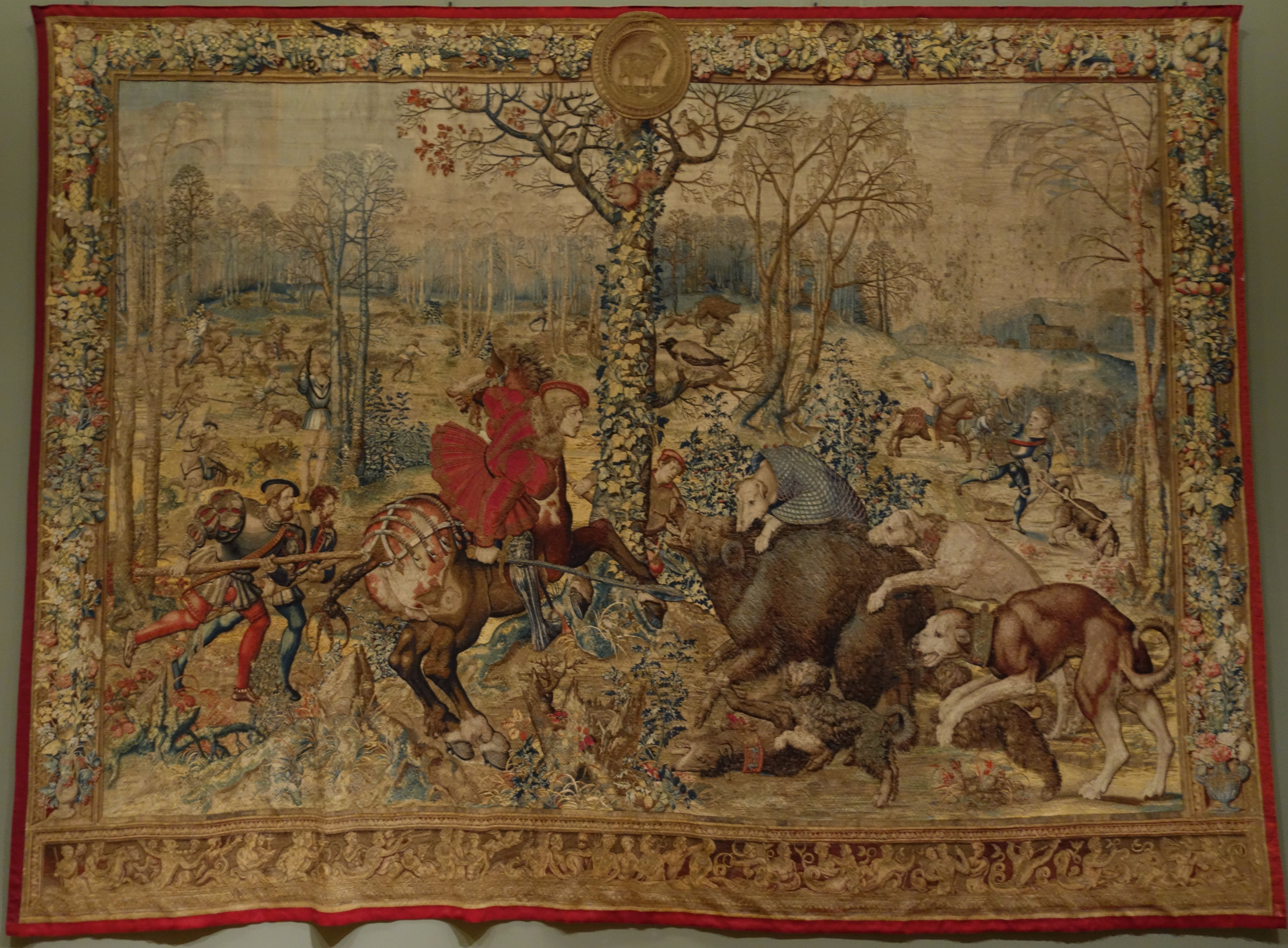
Hunt of Maximilian, December, from the series of tapestries named Hunts of Maximilian completed in the 1530s. The boar sword Maximilian was holding was invented by him.

Maximilian associated the practical art of hunting (as well as fishing and falconry) with his status as prince and knight. He introduced parforce and park hunting to Germany. He also published essays on these topics. In this he followed Frederick II Hohenstaufen and was equally attentive to naturalist details but less scientific. His Tyrol Fishery Book (Tiroler Fischereibuch) was composed with the help from his fish master Martin Fritz and Wolfgang Hohenleiter. To keep fish fresh, he invented a special kind of fish container. While he was unconcerned with the disappearance or weakening of the knight class due to the development of artillery and infantry, Maximilian worried greatly about the vulnerability of ibexes, described by him as "noble creatures", in front of handguns and criticized the peasants in particular for having no moderation. In 1517, the emperor banned the manufacturing and possession of the wheellock, which was designed and especially effective for hunting. Another possible reason for this earliest attempt at gun control might be related to worries about the spreading of crimes. He investigated, classified and protected game reserves, which also damaged the farmers' crops as he forbade them to erect fences. Game population quickly increased though. In one case, he became an unintentional species conservationist: As he had Tyrolean mountain lakes stocked with trouts, a variety of the last trout originating from the Danube, the Kaiser Max trout, has survived until this day in Gossenköllesee.

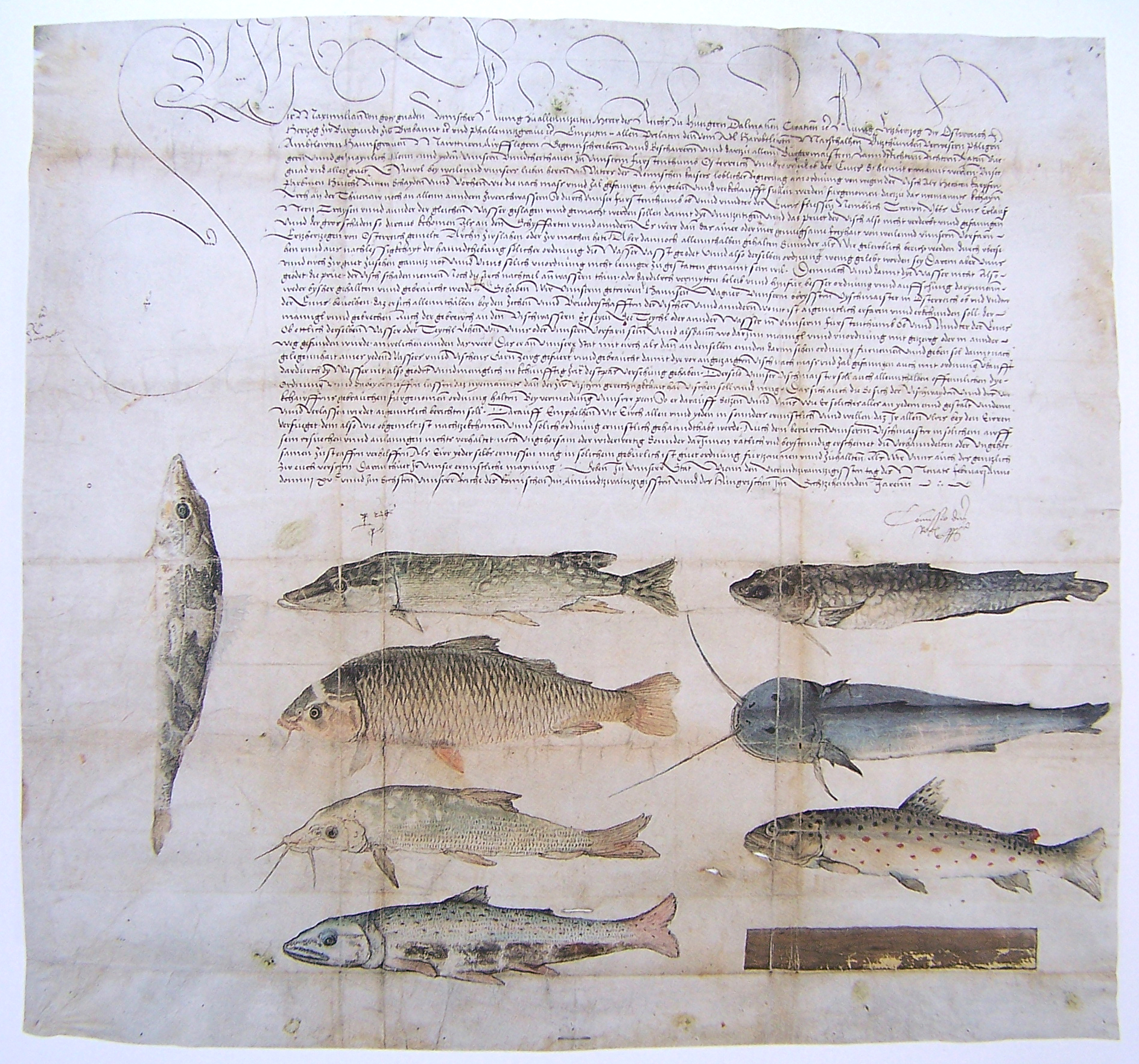
Maximilian's Fishing Code for Upper and Lower Austria, 1506. The species illustrated here (from left) are zingel, pike, carp, barbel, huchen, burbot, catfish and trout. Despite its disguise as a mandate (that has never been disseminated or put into practice; the content is also not consistent), this is apparently a work of art that is influenced by or tries to compete with Albrecht Dürer's naturalist drawings. The Chancellery notation suggests the emperor's personal involvement in developing the document.

Since he was young, in Germany and especially in the Low Countries, he paid attention to the burghers' art of archery, joined archery competitions and gave patronage to crossbow and archery guilds (in military affairs though, he officially abolished the crossbow in 1517 despite its continued use in other countries). Although he never gained complete popular support in Flanders, these patronage activities helped him to build up a relationship with guild members who participated in his campaigns, notably for Guinegate (1479), and rally urban support during his time in the Low Countries. His name heads the list of lords in the huge 1488 Saint George guild-book in Ghent. In the early sixteenth century, he built a Guildhouse for the St.Sebastian's Archers at The Hague.

The 1511 Landlibell (a military statue and "a cornerstone of Tyrol's democracy", which established the foundation for Tyrol's separate defence organization by exempting the population from military service outside their borders but requiring them to serve in the defence of their region, and recognizing the connection between freedom and the rights to bear arms), which remained largely in effect until the fall of monarchy, led to the establishment of armed militia formations called (Tiroler) Schützen. The term Schützen had been used to refer to men armed with crossbows, but Maximilian enthusiastically encouraged riflemen and firearms. These formations still exist, although they have become non-governmental since 1918. In 2019, they organized a great shooting event in commemoration of the emperor.

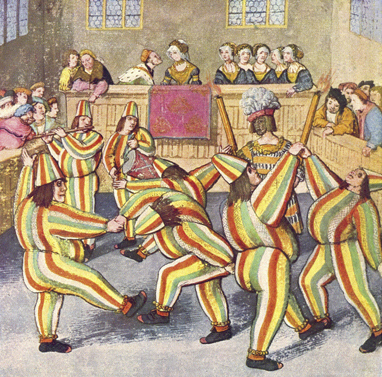
Freydal, fol.164. A post-tournament festivity: Grotesque dancers performed a moresca while Freydal, in a mask and holding torches, observed them.

Another art associated with chivalry and military activities was dancing. As the landsknechte's fighting techniques were developed, they no longer preferred fighting along a straight line (as exercised by even the Swiss until the end of the fifteenth century), but leaned towards a circle-wise movement that enhanced the use of the space around the combatant and allowed them to attack the opponents from different angles. The circle-wise formation described by Jean Molinet as the "snail" would become the hallmark of landsknechte's combat. The new types of combat also required the maintenance of a stable bodily equilibrium. Maximilian, an innovator of these types of movements, also saw value in their effects over the maintenance of group discipline (apart from the control of centralized institutions). As Maximilian and his commanders sought to popularize these forms of movements (which only became daily practice at the end of the fifteen century and gained dominance after Maximilian's death in 1519), he promoted them in tournaments, in fencing and in dancing as well—which started to focus on steps and the movements of the feet over the movements of the head and the arms. The courtly festivals became a playground for innovations, foreshadowing developments in military practices. Regarding dancing, other elements favoured by Maximilian's court were the Moriskentan ("Moors' dance", "Morris-dance", or Moresca), the masquerades (mummerei) and the use of torchbearers. Torchbearers are a part of almost all of the illustrated costumed circle dances in the Weisskunig and Freydal, with Maximilian himself usually being one of them. Masquerades usually included dancing to the music of fifes and drums, performed by the same musicians who served the new infantry forces. The famous humanist philosopher Julius Caesar Scaliger, who grew up as a page at Maximilian's court, reportedly performed the Pyrrhic war dance, which he reconstructed from ancient sources, in front of the emperor. The annual Tänzelfest, the oldest children's festival in Bavaria, reportedly founded by Maximilian in 1497 (the event only appeared in written sources from 1658), includes dancing, processions, and reenactment of city life under Maximilian.

== Cultural patronage, reforms, and image building ==
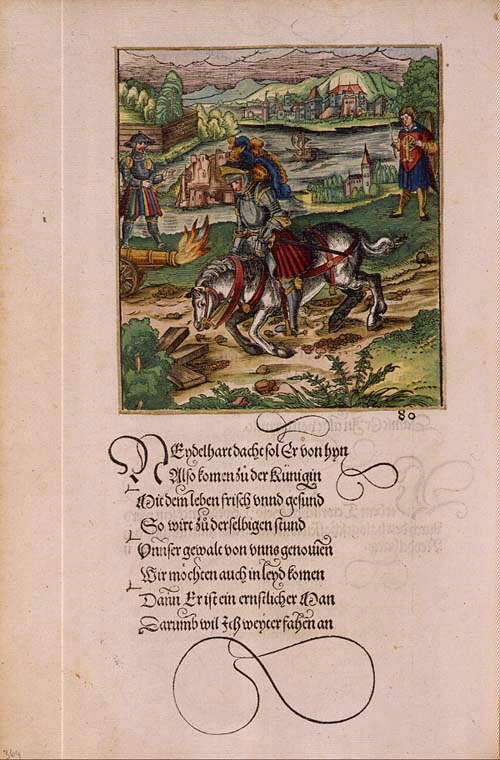
Page from Theuerdank, Second Edition. 1519: Coloured by Leonard Beck. Chapter 80: Maximilian's horse is hit by a cannonball and falls.

Maximilian was a keen supporter of the arts and sciences, and he surrounded himself with scholars such as Joachim Vadian and Andreas Stoberl (Stiborius), promoting them to important court posts. Many of them were commissioned to assist him complete a series of projects, in different art forms, intended to glorify for posterity his life and deeds and those of his Habsburg ancestors. He referred to these projects as Gedechtnus ("memorial"), which included a series of stylised autobiographical works: the epic poems Theuerdank and Freydal, and the chivalric novel Weisskunig, both published in editions lavishly illustrated with woodcuts. In this vein, he commissioned a series of three monumental woodblock prints: The Triumphal Arch (1512–18, 192 woodcut panels, 295 cm wide and 357 cm high—approximately 9'8" by 11'8½"); and a Triumphal Procession (1516–18, 137 woodcut panels, 54 m long), which is led by a Large Triumphal Carriage (1522, 8 woodcut panels, 1½' high and 8' long), created by artists including Albrecht Dürer, Albrecht Altdorfer and Hans Burgkmair. According to The Last Knight: The Art, Armor, and Ambition of Maximilian I, Maximilian dictated large parts of the books to his secretary and friend Marx Treitzsaurwein who did the rewriting. Authors of the book Emperor Maximilian I and the Age of Durer cast doubt on his role as a true patron of the arts though, as he tended to favor pragmatic elements over high arts. On the other hand, he was a perfectionist who involved himself with every stage of the creative processes. His goals extended far beyond the emperor's own glorification too: commemoration also included the documentation in details of the presence and the restoration of source materials and precious artifacts.

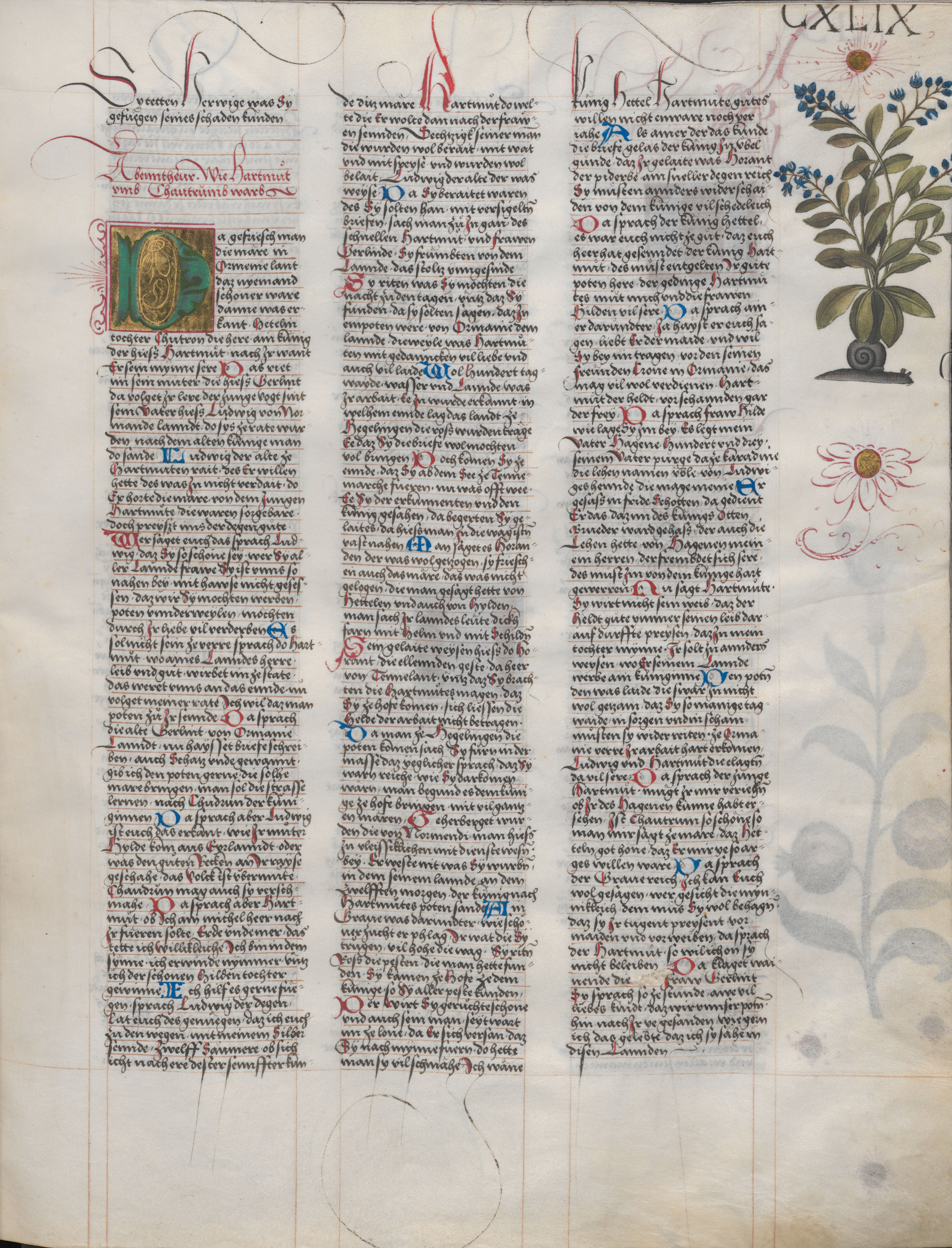
Ambraserheldenbuch. Fol. 149r. The large initial marks the start of the 10th "Aventiure" of Kudrun.

Notorious for his micro-managing, there was a notable case in which the emperor allowed and encouraged free-ranging, even wild improvisations: his Book of Prayers. The work shows a lack of constraint, and no consistent iconographic program on the part of the artist (Dürer), which would be realized and highly praised by Goethe in 1811.

In 1504, Maximilian commissioned the Ambraser Heldenbuch, a compendium of German medieval narratives (the majority was heroic epics), which was written by Hans Ried. The work was of great importance to German literature because among its twenty five narratives, fifteen were unique. This would be the last time the Nibelungenlied was enshrined in German literature before being rediscovered again 250 years later. Maximilian was also a patron of Ulrich von Hutten whom he crowned as Poet Laureate in 1517 and the humanist Willibald Pirckheimer, who was one of Germany's most important patrons of arts in his own right.

As Rex litteratus, he supported all the literary genres that had been supported by his predecessors, in addition to drama, a genre that had been gaining in popularity in his era. Joseph Grünpeck attracted his attention with Comoediae duae, presumably the first German Neo-Latin festival plays. He was impressed with Joseph Grünpeck's Streit zwischen Virtus und Fallacicaptrix, a morality play in which Maximilian himself was asked to choose between virtue and base pleasure. Celtis wrote for him Ludus Dianae and Rhapsodia de laudibus et victoria Maximiliani de Boemannis. The Ludus Dianae displays the symbiotic relationship between ruler and humanist, who are both portrayed as Apollonian or Phoebeian, while Saturn—as counterpole of Phoebus—is a negative force and Bacchus as well as Venus display dangerous aspects in tempting humans towards a depraving life. Locher wrote the first German Neo-Latin tragedy, also the first German Humanist tragedy, the Historia de Rege Frantie. Other notable authors included Benedictus Chelidonius and Hieronymus Vehus. These plays often doubled as encomium or dramatized newe zeittung (news reports) in support of imperial or princely politics. Douglas A. Russel remarks that the academic mode of theater, associated with the new interest Humanism and the Classics at that time, was mainly the work of Konrad Celtis, Joachim von Watt (who was a poet laureate crowned by Maximilian and at age 32 was Rector at the University of Vienna), and Benedictus Chelidonius. William Cecil McDonald comments that, in the context of German medieval literary patronage, "Maximilian's literary activities not only 'summarize' the literary patronage of the Middle Ages, but also represent a point of departure—a beacon for a new age." Moreover, "Like Charlemagne, Otto the Great, Henry II, and Frederick Barbarossa, Maximilian was a fostering spirit, i.e. he not only commissioned literature, but through his policies and the force of his personality he created a climate conducive to the flowering of the arts."

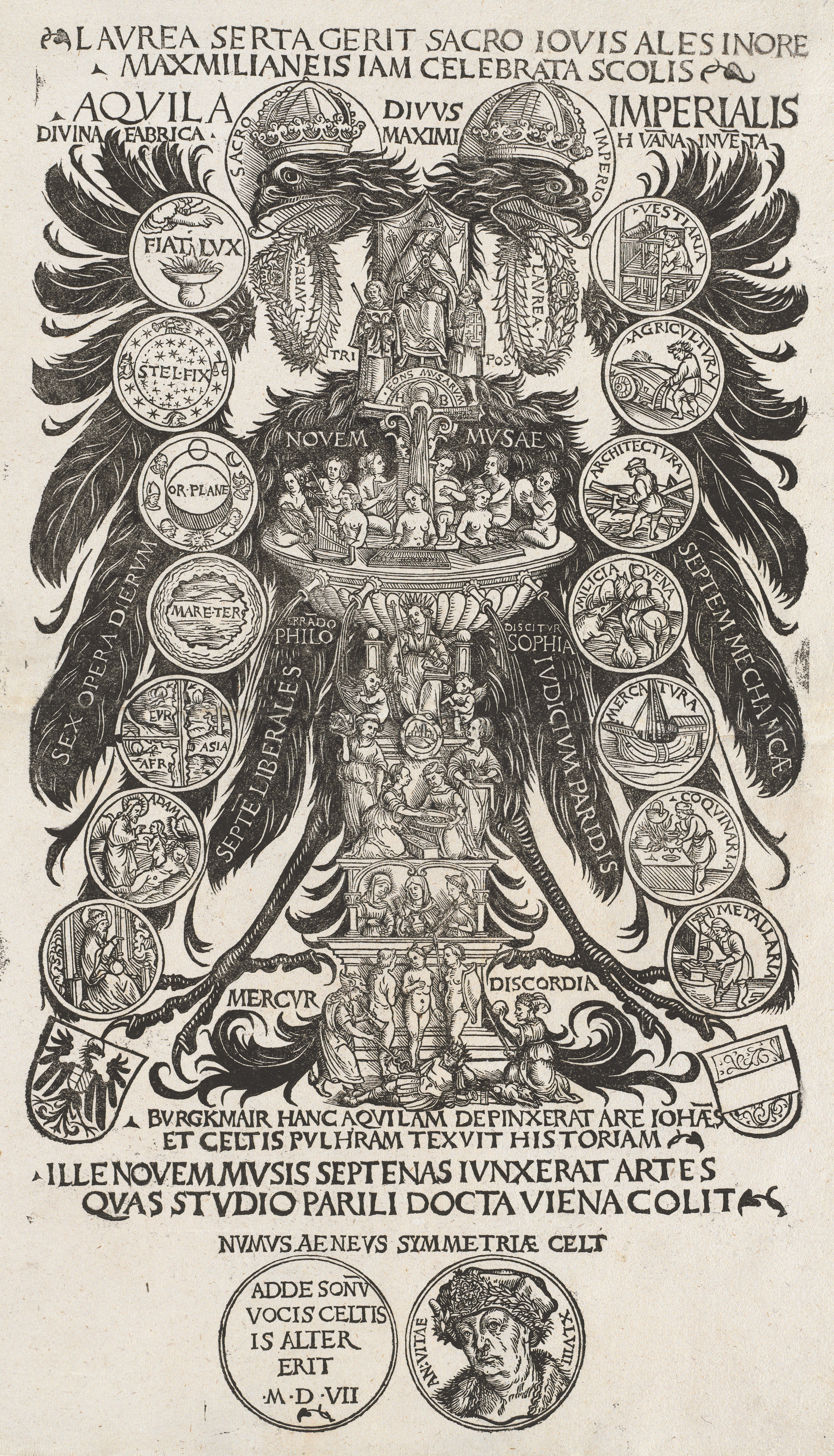
Hans Burgkmair, The Imperial Eagle, 1507, NGA 39804. The Imperial Eagle is sheltering Maximilian, presented here as a seated Apollo, the Muses and other figures. This is considered an allegory, suggested by Konrad Celtis (bottom figure), of the emperor, the University of Vienna and the Empire. Apollo was the god often associated with the emperor by many artists and humanists, who designed a mission for him not only as the promoter of arts and sciences but also in the realm of politics. Under the wings is the scientific model of the University of Vienna, designed by Celtis.

Under his rule, the University of Vienna reached its apogee as a centre of humanistic thought. He established the College of Poets and Mathematicians which was incorporated into the university. Maximilian invited Conrad Celtis, the leading German scientist of their day to University of Vienna. Celtis found the Sodalitas litteraria Danubiana (which was also supported by Maximilian), an association of scholars from the Danube area, to support literature and humanist thought. Maximilian also promoted the development of the young Habsburg University of Freiburg and its host city, in consideration of the city's strategic position. He gave the city privileges, helped it to turn the corner financially while utilizing the university's professors for important diplomatic missions and key positions at the court. The Chancellor Konrad Stürtzel, twice the university's rector, acted as the bridge between Maximilian and Freiburg. Maximilian supported and utilized the humanists partly for propaganda effect, partly for his genealogical projects, but he also employed several as secretaries and counsellors—in their selection he rejected class barriers, believing that "intelligent minds deriving their nobility from God", even if this caused conflicts (even physical attacks) with the nobles. He relied on his humanists to create a nationalistic imperial myth, in order to unify the Reich against the French in Italy, as pretext for a later Crusade (the Estates protested against investing their resources in Italy though). Maximilian told his Electors each to establish a university in their realm. Thus in 1502 and 1506, together with the Elector of Saxony and the Elector of Brandenburg, respectively, he co-found the University of Wittenberg and the University of Frankfurt. The University of Wittenberg was the first German university established without a papal bull, signifying the secular imperial authority concerning universities. This first center in the North where old Latin scholarly traditions were overthrown would become the home of Luther and Melanchthon.

As he was too distant, his patronage of Humanism and humanistic books in particular did not reach the Netherlands (and as Mary of Burgundy died too young while Philip the Fair and Charles V were educated in the Burgundian tradition, there was no sovereign who fostered humanistic Latin culture in the Netherlands, although they had their own mode of learning). There were exchanges and arguments over political ideas and values between the two sides though. Maximilian greatly admired his father-in-law Charles the Bold (he even adopted Charles's motto as one of his own, namely, "I dared it!", or "Je l'ay emprint!") and promoted his conception that the sovereign's power and magnificence came directly from God and not through the mediation of the Church. This concept was part of Maximilian's political program (including other elements such as the recovery of Italy, the position of the Emperor as dominus mundi, expansionism, the crusade...etc.), supported in the Netherlands by Paul of Middelburg but considered extreme by Erasmus. Concerning heroic models that rulers should follow (especially concerning the education of Archduke Charles, who would later be influenced much by his grandfather's knightly image), Antoine Haneron proposed ancient heroes, above all Alexander (who Charles adopted as a great role model for all his life) while Molinet presented Alexander, Caesar and Semiramis, but Erasmus protested Alexander, Caesar and Xerxes as models. Maximilian strongly promoted the first two though, as well as St. George (both in "Frederican" and "Burgundian" forms). The idea of peace also became more pronounced in Maximilian's court in his last years though, likely influenced by Flemish humanism, especially Erasmian (Maximilian himself was an unabashed warlike prince, but late in his life, he believed that his 27 wars only served the devil). Responding to the intense Burgundian humanistic discourse on nobility by birth and nobility by virtue, the emperor pushed his own modification: office versus birth (with a strong emphasis on the primacy of office over birth). Noflatscher opines that the emperor was probably the most important mediator of the Burgundian model himself, with Bianca Maria also having influence (although she could only partially fulfill her role).

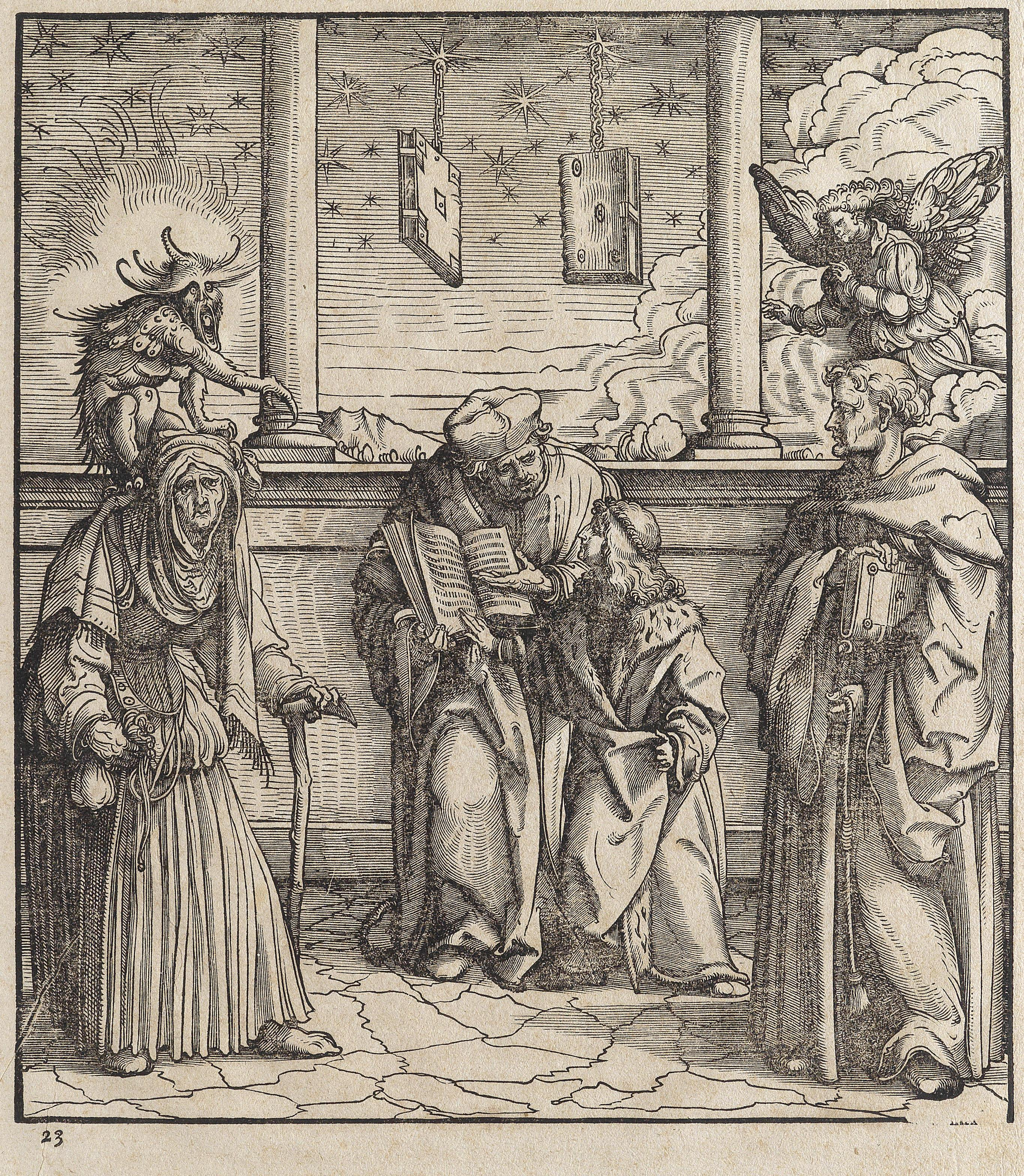
Hans Burgkmair, Weisskunig, The young White King learns black magic

The Italian philosopher Gianfrancesco Pico della Mirandola dedicated his 1500 work De imaginatione, a treatise on the human mind (in which he synthesized Aristotle, Neoplatonism and Girolamo Savonarola), to Maximilian. The Italian philosopher and theologian Tommaso Radini Tedeschi also dedicated his 1511 work La Calipsychia sive de pulchritudine animae to the emperor.

In philosophy, besides Humanism, esotericism had a notable influence during Maximilian's time. In 1505, he sent Johannes Trithemius eight questions concerning spiritual and religious matters (Questions 3, 5, 6, 7 were concerned with witchcraft) that Trithemius answered and later published in the 1515 book Liber octo questionum (Books of eight questions). Maximilian displayed a skeptical aspect, posing questions such as why God permitted witches and their powers to control evil spirits. The authors (now usually identified as Heinrich Kramer alone) of the most notorious work on witchcraft of the time, Malleus Maleficarum, claimed that they had his letter of approval (supposedly issued in November 1486) to act as inquisitors, but according to Behringer, Durrant and Bailey, he likely never supported them (although Kramer apparently went to Brussels, the Burgundian capital, in 1486, hoping to influence the young king—they did not dare to involve Frederick III, whom Kramer had offended some years earlier). Trithemius dedicated the De septem secundeis ("The Seven Secondary Intelligences"), which argued that the cycle of ages was ruled by seven planetary angels, in addition to God (the First Intelligence). The historian Martin Hollegger notes though that Maximilian himself did not share the cyclical view of history, typical for their contemporaries, nor believed that their age would be the last age. He had a linear understanding of time—that progresses would make the world better. (Note: "His belief in progress was already remarkably "modern", leading him to instruct obstinate powers like the Austrian estates that the world was constantly moving forward into a better future, so that they should just allow him to set his reforms in motion even if they failed to understand the new developments themselves.") The kabbalistic elements in the court as well as Trithemius himself influenced the thinking of the famous polymath and occultist Heinrich Cornelius Agrippa (who in Maximilian's time served mainly as secretary, soldier and diplomatic spy). The emperor, having interest in the occult himself, intended to write two books on magic (Zauberpuech) and black magic (Schwartzcunnstpuech) but did not have time for them.

Like his father, Maximilian was an alchemist, who at times locked himself up in his room for days to experiment. He collaborated with his sister-in-law Caterina Sforza (her work Experiments records a recipe for an emetic powder attributed to him). He sponsored such experiments too. According to Leonhard Thurneysser, in 1499 an alchemist named Schwichard Fronberger set up for him an astro-alchemical project that would theoretically produce silver in 1547 and gold in 1598 (Maximilian was 40 in 1499). In his circle, Reisch and Agrippa were also interested in alchemy, although Agrippa joined a secret society that did not allow publishing about this topic.

The establishment of the new Courts and the formal Reception of Roman Law in 1495 led to the formation of a professional lawyer class as well as a bureaucratic judiciary. Legal scholars trained in mos italicus (either in Italian universities or in newly established German universities) became in demand. Among the prominent lawyers and legal scholars who served Maximilian in various capacities and provided legal advices to the emperor were Mercurino Gattinara, Sebastian Brandt and Ulrich Zasius. Together with the aristocrats and the literati (who participated in Maximilian's propaganda and intellectual projects), the lawyers and legal scholars became one of three main groups in Maximilian's court. Konrad Stürtzel, the Chancellor, belonged to this group. In Maximilian's court—more egalitarian than any previous German or Imperial court, with its burghers and peasants—all these groups were treated equally in promotions and rewards. The individuals were also blending in many respects, usually through marriage alliances.

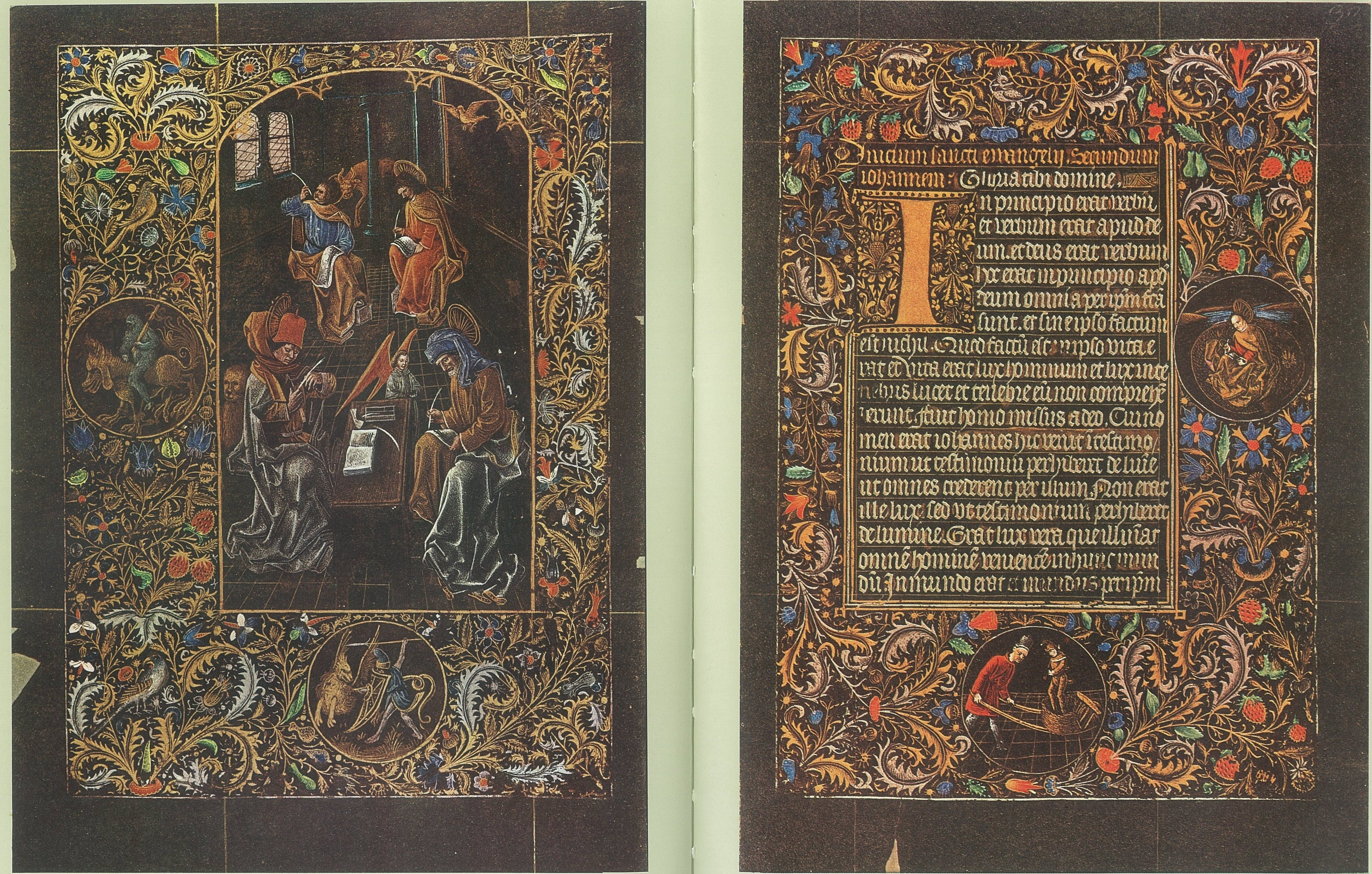
Black Hours of Galeazzo Maria Sforza, M 1856, now in the Austrian National Library in Vienna (Codex Vindobon. 1856). The book was made for Maximilian's future father-in-law Charles the Bold in 1466 by Bruges, then given to Galeazzo Maria Sforza likely in 1475–76 during his and Charles's brief alliance, became Bianca Maria Sforza's property, and was finally brought to Maximilian's library after Bianca's and Maximilian's marriage in 1494.

Maximilian was an energetic patron of the library. Previous Habsburg rulers such as Albert III and Maximilian's father Frederick III (who collected the 110 books that were the core inventory of the later library) had also been instrumental in centralizing art treasures and book collections. Maximilian became a bibliophile during the time he was in the Low Countries. As husband of Mary of Burgundy, he would come into possession of the huge Burgundian library, which according to some sources was brought to Austria when he returned to his native land. According to the official website of the Austrian National Library though, the Habsburgs only brought the collection to Vienna in 1581. Maximilian also inherited the Tyrol library of his uncle Sigismund, also a great cultural patron (which had received a large contribution from Eleanor of Scotland, Sigismund's wife and also a great lover of books). When he married Bianca Maria, Italian masterpieces were incorporated into the collection. The collection became more organized when Maximilian commissioned Ladislaus Sunthaim, Jakob Mennel and Johannes Cuspinian to acquire and compose books. By the beginning of the sixteenth century, the library had acquired significant Bohemian, French and Italian book art. In 1504, Conrad Celtis spoke the first time of the Bibliotheca Regia (which would evolve into the Imperial Library, and as it is named today, the Österreichische Nationalbibliothek or the Austrian National Library), an organized library that had been expanded through purchases. Maximilian's collection was dispersed between Innsbruck, Vienna and Wiener Neustadt. The Wiener Neustadt part was under Conrad Celtis's management. The more valuable part was in Innsbruck. Already in Maximilian's time, the idea and function of libraries were changing and it became important that scholars gained access to the books. Under Maximilian, who was casual in his attitude to scholars, (which marvelled the French chronicler Pierre Frossart) (Note: "'The Emperor', he writes, 'not only calls them his friends, but treats them as such, and it appears to me that he seeks their society gladly, and is much influenced by them. There is certainly no other ruler who is so willing to learn from those more learned than he is, and whose own mind is so cultivated that his questions are themselves instructive'.") it was fairly easy for a scholar to gain access to the emperor, the court and thus the library. But despite the intention of rulers like Maximilian II (and his chief Imperial Librarian Blotius) and Charles VI to make the library open to the general public, the process was only completed in 1860.

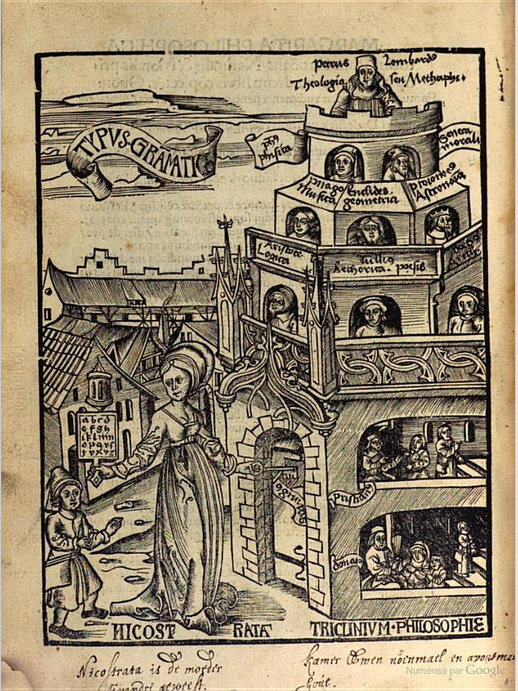
Margarita philosophica by Gregor Reisch (1504)

During Maximilian's time, there were several projects of an encyclopaedic nature, among them the incomplete projects of Conrad Celtis. However, as the founder of the Collegium poetarum et mathematicorum and a "program thinker" (programmdenker, term used by Jan-Dirk Müller and Hans-Joachim Ziegeler), Celtis established an encyclopaedic-scientific model that increasingly integrated and favoured mechanical arts in relation to the combination between natural sciences and technology and associated them with divina fabrica (God's creation in the six days). In consistence with Celtis's design, the university's curriculum and the political and scientific order of Maximilian's time (which was also influenced by developments in the previous eras), the humanist Gregor Reisch, who was also Maximilian's confessor, produced the Margarita Philosophica, "the first modern encyclopaedia of any importance", first published in 1503. The work covers rhetoric, grammar, logic, music, mathematical topics, childbirth, astronomy, astrology, chemical topics (including alchemy), and hell.

Universalis Cosmographia, Waldseemüller's 1507 world map which was the first to show the Americas separate from Asia

An area that saw many new developments under Maximilian was cartography, of which the important center in Germany was Nuremberg. In 1515, Dürer and Johannes Stabius created the first world map projected on a solid geometric sphere. Bert De Munck and Antonella Romano make a connection between the mapmaking activities of Dürer and Stabius with efforts to grasp, manipulate and represent time and space, which was also associated with Maximilian's "unprecedented dynastic mythmaking" and pioneering printed works like the Triumphal Arch and the Triumphal Procession. Maximilian assigned Johannes Cuspinianus and Stabius to compile a topography of Austrian lands and a set of regional maps. Stabius and his friend Georg Tannstetter worked together on the maps. The work appeared in 1533 but without maps. The 1528 Lazarus-Tannstetter map of Tabulae Hungariae (one of the first regional maps in Europe) though seemed to be related to the project. The cartographers Martin Waldseemüller and Matthias Ringmann dedicated their famous work Universalis Cosmographia to Maximilian, although the direct backer was Rene II of Loraine. The 1513 edition of Geography, which contained this map and was also dedicated to Maximilian, by Jacobus Aeschler and Georgius Ubelin, is considered by Armando Cortes to be the climax of a cartography revolution. The emperor himself dabbled in cartography. (Note: "[...]The bishop of Chiemsee, writing to the cardinal of Siena in January of 1491, that Maximilian knew the topography of his lands so well that he could jot down an impromptu map of any region.") According to Buisseret, Maximilian could "call upon a variety of cartographic talent unrivalled anywhere else in Europe at that time" (that included Celtis, Stabius, Cuspinianus, Jacob Ziegler, Johannes Aventinus and Tannstetter). The development in cartography was tied to the emperor's special interest in sea route exploration, as an activity concerning his global monarchy concept, and his responsibilities as Duke consort to Mary of Burgundy, grandfather of the future ruler of Spain as well as ally and close relation to Portuguese kings. He sent men like Martin Behaim und Hieronymus Münzer to the Portuguese court to cooperate in their exploration efforts as well as to act as his own representatives. Another involved in the network was the Flemish Josse van Huerter or Joss de Utra who would become the first settler of the island of Faial in the Portuguese Azores. Maximilian also played an essential role in connecting the financial houses in Augsburg and Nuremberg (including the companies of Höchstetter, Fugger and Welser etc.) to Portuguese expeditions. In exchange for financial backing, King Manuel provided German investors with generous privileges. The humanist Conrad Peutinger was an important agent who acted as advisor to financiers, translator of voyage records and imperial councillor. Harald Kleinschmidt opines that regarding the matter of world exploration as well as the "transformation of European world picture" in general, Maximilian was "a crucial though much underestimated figure" of his time.

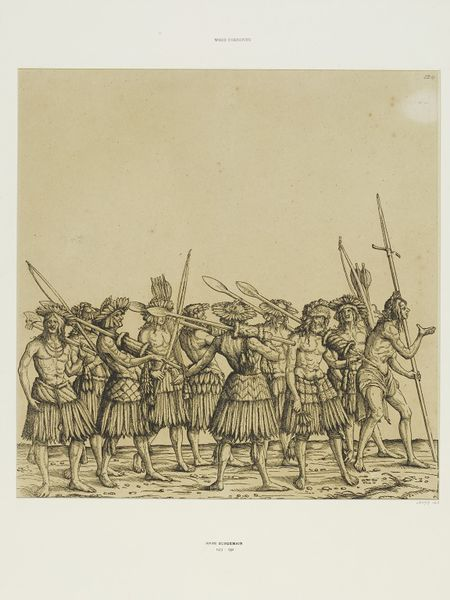
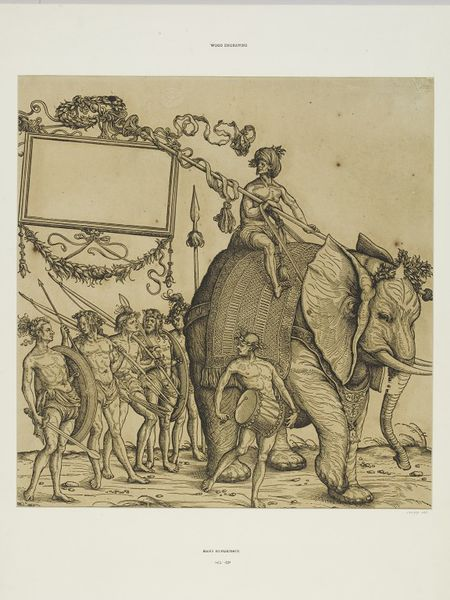
People of Calicut, from the Triumphal Procession.

The evolution of cartography was connected to development in ethnography and the new Humanist science of chorography (promoted by Celtis at the University of Vienna). As Maximilian already promoted the Ur-German after much archaeological and textual excavation as well as embraced the early German wildness, Peutinger correctly deduced that he would support German exploration of another primitive people as well. Using the Welser's commercial ventures as a pretext, Peutinger goaded Maximilian into backing his ethnographical interests in the Indians and supporting the 1505–1506 voyage of Balthasar Springer around Africa to India. Besides, this endeavour added to the emperor's image as a conqueror and ruler, also to rival the claims of his arch-rival Suleiman the Magnificent regarding a global empire. Based on an instruction dictated by Maximilian in 1512 regarding Indians in the Triumphal Procession, Jörg Kölderer executed a series of (now lost) drawings, which served as the guideline for Altdorfer's miniatures in 1513–1515, which in turn became the model for woodcuts (half of them based on now lost 1516–1518 drawings by Burgkmair) showing "the people of Calicut." In 1508, Burgkmair produced the People of Africa and India series, focusing on depicting the peoples whom Springer encountered along coastal Africa and India. The series brought into being "a basic set of analytic categories that ethnography would take as its methodological foundation". As part of his dealings with Moscow, the Jagiellons and the Slavic East in general, Maximilian surrounded himself with people from the Slovenian territories and familiar with Slavic languages, such as Sigismund von Herberstein (himself a prominent ethnographer), Petrus Bonomo, George Slatkonia and Paulus Oberstain. Political necessities overcame the prejudice against living languages, which started to find a place along Latin throughout central Europe, also in scholarly areas.

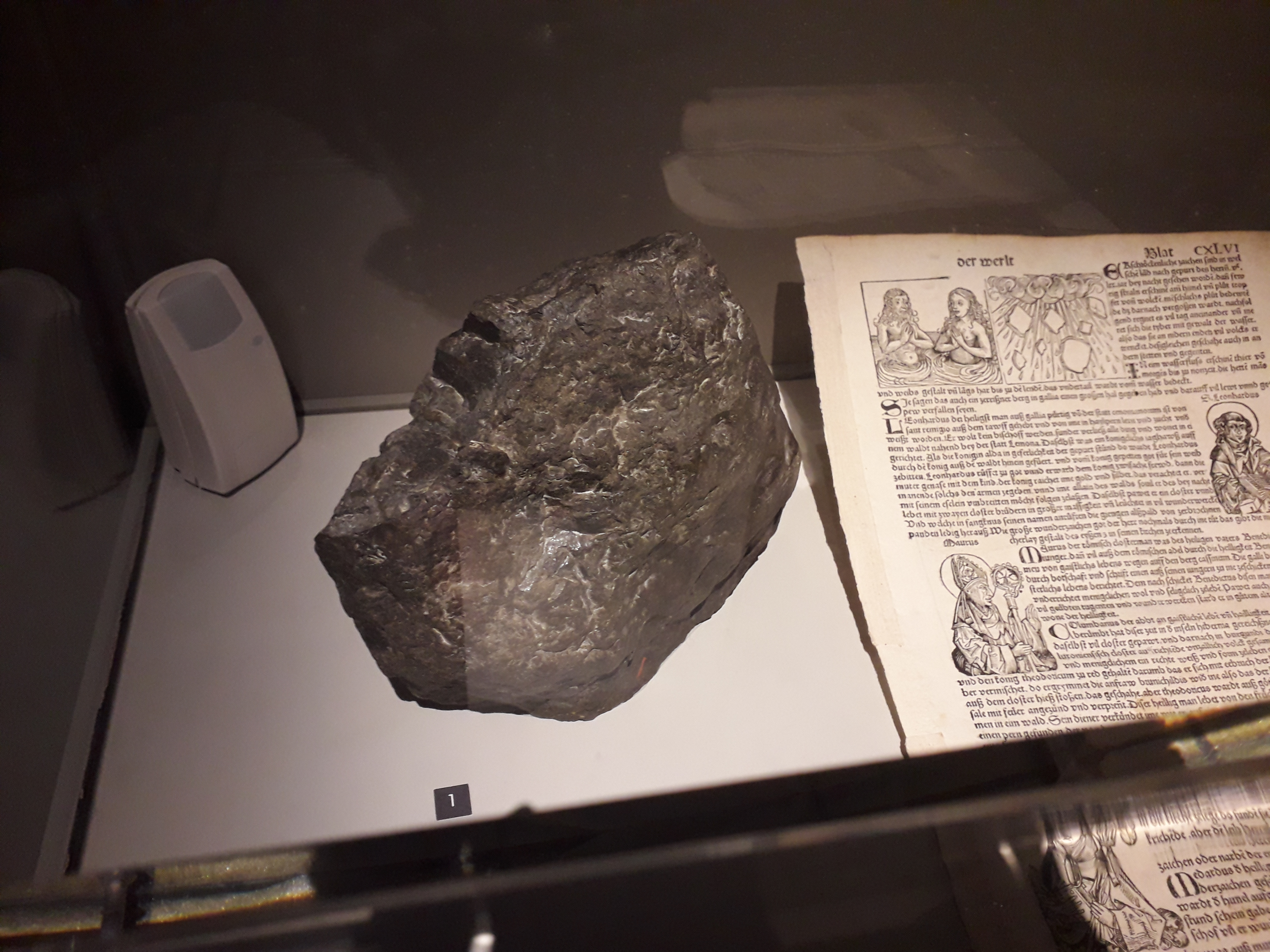
Ensisheim meteorite, National Museum of Natural History, France

The emperor's program of restoring the University of Vienna to its former pre-eminence was also concerned with astrology and astronomy. He realized the potential of the print press when combined with these branches of learning, and employed Georg Tannstetter (who, in 1509, was appointed by Maximilian as the Professor of Astronomy at the University of Vienna and also worked for a joint calendar reform attempt with the Pope) to produce yearly practica and wall calendars. In 1515, Stabius (who also acted as the court astronomer), Dürer and the astronomer Konrad Heinfogel produced the first planispheres of both southern and northern hemispheres, also the first printed celestial maps. These maps prompted the revival of interest in the field of uranometry throughout Europe. The Ensisheim meteorite fell on earth during the reign of Maximilian (7 November 1492). This was one of the oldest meteorite impacts in recorded history. King Maximilian, who was on his way to a campaign against France, ordered for it to be dug up and preserved at a local church. The meteorite, as a good omen, was utilized for propaganda against France through the use of broadsheets with dramatic pictures under the direction of the poet Sebastian Brandt (as Maximilian defeated a far larger French army to his own in Senlis two months later, the news would spread even more).

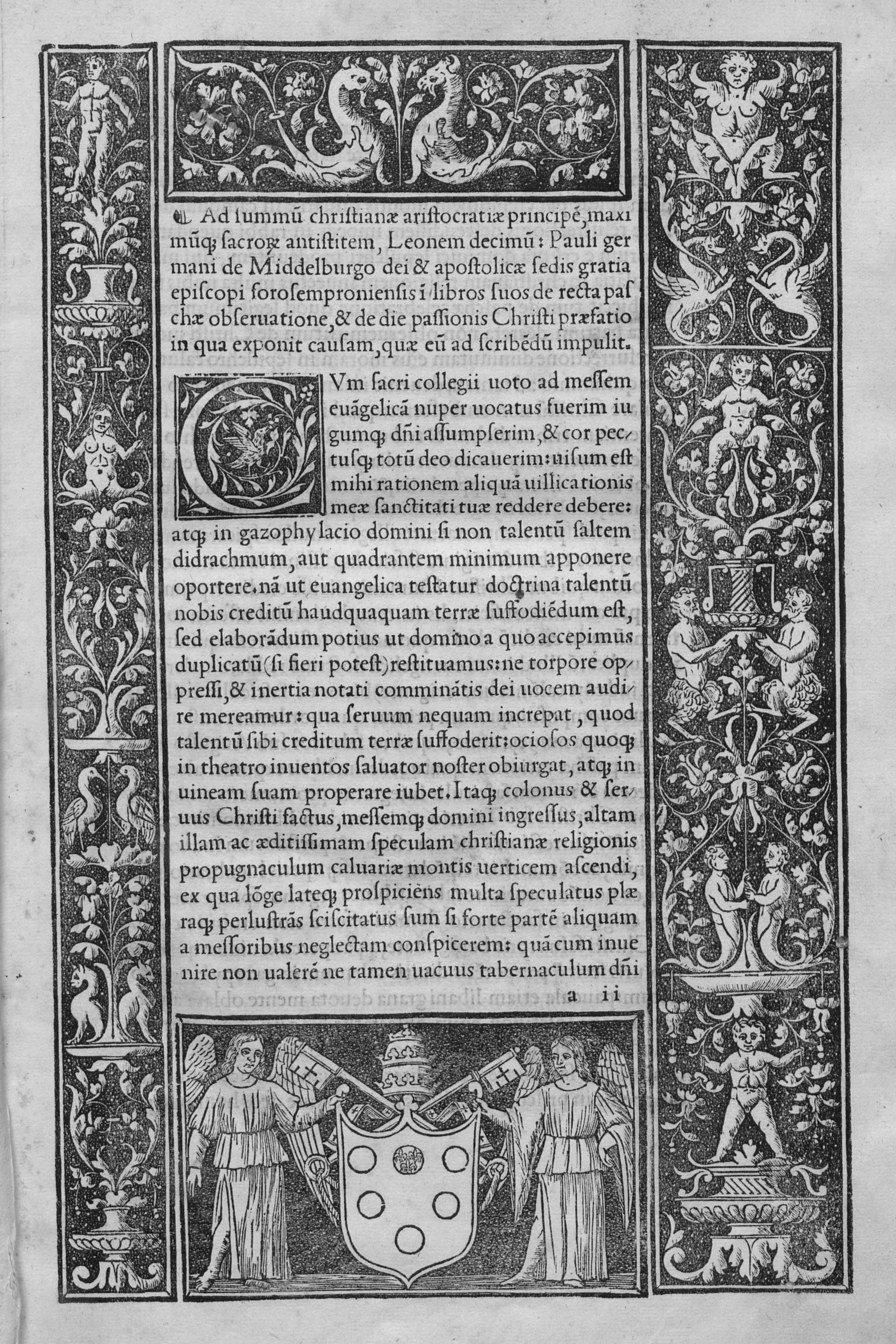
De recta Paschae celebratione by Paul of Middelburg, 1513.

On the subject of calendars and calendar reform, already in 1484, the famous Flemish scientist Paul of Middelburg dedicated his Praenostica ad viginti annos duratura to Maximilian. His 1513 magnum opus Paulina de recta Paschae celebratione was also dedicated to Maximilian, together with Leo X.

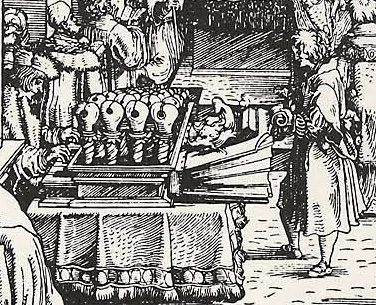
Paul Hofhaimer playing the Apfelregal, detail from Emperor Maximilian hearing Mass, by Hans Weiditz, 1518.

In addition to maps, other astrological, geometrical and horological instruments were also developed, chiefly by Stiborius and Stabius, who understood the need to cooperate with the emperors to make these instruments into useful tools for propaganda also. The extraordinarily luxurious planetarium, that took twelve men to carry and was given as a diplomatic gift by Ferdinand I to Suleiman the Magnificent in 1541, originally belonged to Maximilian. He loved to introduce newly invented musical instruments. In 1506, he had a special regal, likely the apfelregal seen in one of Hans Weiditz's woodcuts, built for Paul Hofhaimer. The emperor's favourite musical instrument maker was Hans Georg Neuschel of Nuremberg, who created an improved trombone (Neuschel was a talented trombonist himself). In 1500, an elaborated lathe (Drehbank) was created for the emperor's personal carpentry hobby. This is the earliest extant lathe, the earliest known surviving lapidary instrument as well as one of the earliest examples of scientific and technological furniture. The earliest surviving screwdriver has also been found attached to one of his suits of armour. Regiomontanus reportedly made an eagle automaton that moved and greeted him when he came to Nuremberg. Augsburg also courted "their" emperor by building the legendary Nachttor or Night Gate (famous for its many secret mechanisms), intended to make his entrance safer if he returned to the city at night, in 1514. The gate was destroyed in 1867, but plans and descriptions remain so recently Ausburg has created a virtual version. He liked to end his festivals with fireworks. In 1506, on the surface of Lake Konstanz, on the occasion of the gathering of the Reichstag, he staged a show of firework (this was the first recorded German firework, inspired by the example of Italian princes), completed with firework music provided by singers and court trumpeters. Machiavelli judged him as extravagant, but these were not fireworks done for pleasure, peaceful celebration or religious purpose as the type often seen in Italy, but a core ritual of Maximilian's court, that demonstrated the link between pyrotechnics and military technology. The show caused a stir (the news about the event was distributed through a Briefzeitung, or "letter newspaper"), leading to fireworks becoming fashionable. In the Baroque era, it would be a common form of self-stylization for monarchs.

A lot of these scientific and artistic instruments and technical marvels came from Nuremberg, by then the great mechanical, metalworking and precision industry centre of German Renaissance. From 1510, Stabius also took up permanent residence there after travelling with the emperor for years. The city's precision industry and its secondary manufacturing industries were connected to the mining industry, that the leading financiers from the neighbouring Augsburg (which had a flourishing printing industry and was also important for the emperor politically) heavily invested into in partnership with princes like Maximilian.

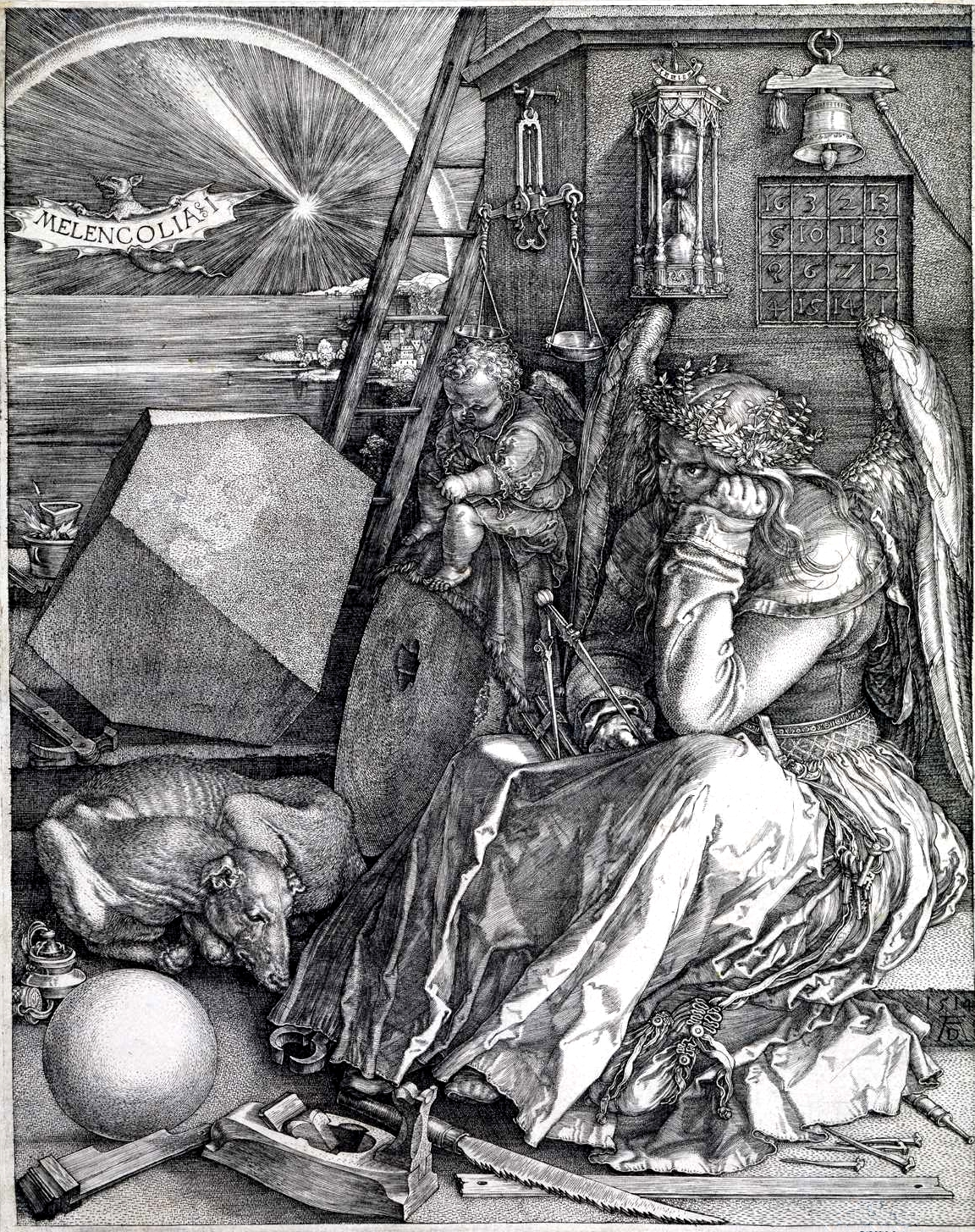
Albrecht Dürer – Melencolia I, the "ripest and most mysterious fruit of the cosmological culture of the age of Maximilian I", according to Aby Warburg.

The development in astronomy, astrology, cosmography and cartography as well as a developing economy with demand for training in book-keeping were tied with the change in status and professionalization of mathematical studies (that once stood behind medicine, jurisprudence and theology as the lowest art) in the universities. The leading figure was George Tanstetter (also the emperor's astrologer and physician), who provided his students with reasonably priced books through the collection and publication of works done by Joannes de Muris, Peuerbach and Regiomontanus and others, as well as wrote Viri Mathematici (Lives of Mathematicians), the first historical study of mathematics of Austria (and also a work to consolidate the position of astronomers, astrologers in Maximilian's court, in imitation of Maximilian's genealogical projects that reinforced his imperial titles). The foremost exponent (and one of the founders) of "descriptive geometry" was Albrecht Dürer himself, whose work Melencolia I was a prime representation and inspired a lot of discussions, including its relation or non-relation to Maximilian's status as the most known melancholic of the time, his and his humanists' fear of the influence of the planet Saturn (some say that the engraving was a self-portrayal of Dürer while others think that it was a talisman for Maximilian to counter Saturn), the Triumphal Arch, hieroglyphics and other esoteric developments in his court, respectively etc.

Maximilian continued with the strong tradition of supporting physicians at court, started by his father Frederick III, despite Maximilian himself had little personal use for them (he usually consulted everyone's opinions and then opted for some self-curing folk practices). He kept on his payroll about 23 court physicians, whom he "poached" during his long travels from the courts of his relatives, friends, rivals and urban hosts. An innovative solution was entrusting these physicians with healthcare in the most important cities, for which purpose an allowance and horses were made available to them. Alessandro Benedetti dedicated his Historia Corporis Humani: sive Anatomice (The Account of Human Body: or Anatomy) to the emperor. As Humanism was established, the Medical Faculty of the University of Vienna increasingly abandoned Scholasticism and focused on studying laws of disease and anatomy based on actual experiences. the early fifteenth century, the Medical Faculty of the university tried to gain influence upon the apothecaries of the city in order to enhance the dispensed medicines' quality and to enforce uniform preparation modes. Finally, in 1517, Maximilian granted them a privilege which allowed the faculty to inspect the Viennese pharmacies and to check the identity, quality and proper storage of the ingredients as well as the formulated preparations. Likely a victim of syphilis (dubbed the "French disease" and used by Maximilian and his humanists like Joseph Grünpeck in their propaganda and artistic works against France) himself, Maximilian had an interest in the disease, which led him to establish eight hospitals in various hereditary lands. He also retained an interest in the healing properties of berries and herbs all his life and invented a recipe for an invigorating stone beer. In Glarus, Switzerland, he is still commemorated for his receipt against plague.

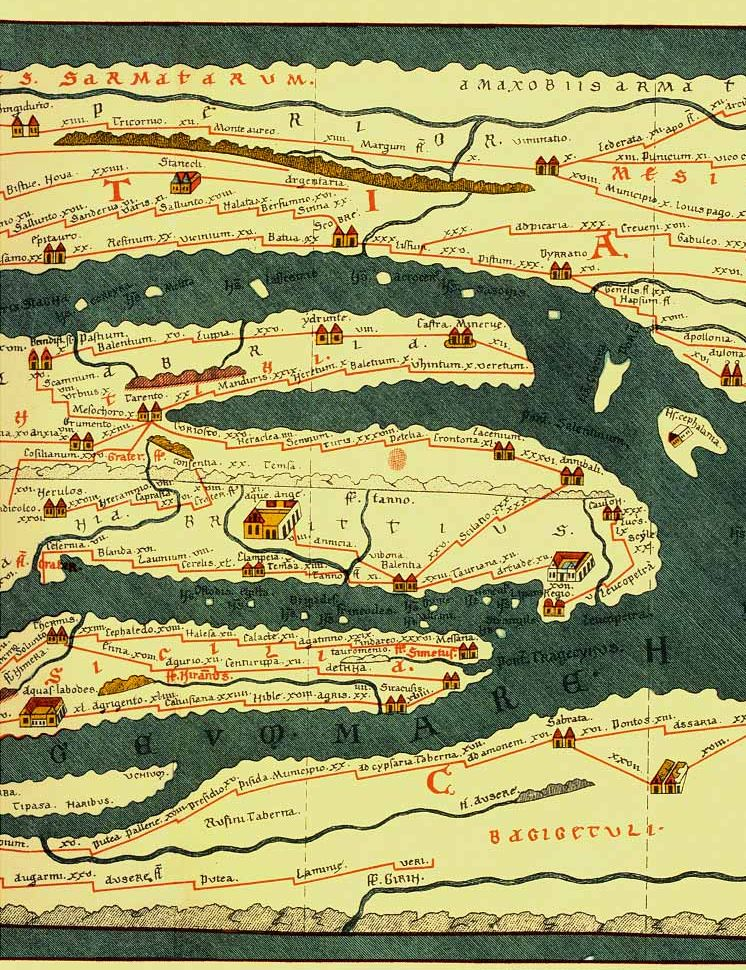
Part of the Tabula Peutingeriana, one of three Roman maps to have survived to this day, discovered (possibly stolen) by Conrad Celtis who bequeathed it to Konrad Peutinger, who then donated it to Maximilian.

Maximilian had an interest in archaeology, "creative and participatory rather than objective and distancing" (and sometimes destructive), according to Christopher S.Wood. His chief advisor on archaeological matters was Konrad Peutinger, who was also the founder of classical Germanic and Roman studies. Peutinger commenced an ambitious project, the Vitae Imperatorum Augustorum, a series of biographies of emperors from Augustus to Maximilian (each biography would also include epigraphic and numismatic evidences), but only the early sections were completed. The search for medals ultimately led to a broad craze in Germany for medals as an alternative for portraiture. At the suggestion of the emperor, the scholar published his collection of Roman inscriptions. Maximilian did not distinguish between the secular and the sacred, the Middle Ages and antiquity, and considered equal in archaeological value the various searches and excavations of the Holy Tunic (rediscovered in Trier in 1513 after Maximilian demanded to see it, and then exhibited, reportedly attracting 100,000 pilgrims), Roman and German reliefs and inscriptions, etc. and the most famous quest of all, the search for the remains of hero Siegfried. Maximilian's private collection activities were carried out by his secretary, the humanist Johann Fuchsmagen, on his behalf. Sometimes, the emperor came in contact with antiquities during his campaigns—for example, an old German inscription found in Kufstein in 1504, that he immediately sent to Peutinger. Around 1512–1514, Pirckheimer translated and presented Maximilian with Horapollo's Hieroglyphica. The hieroglyphics would be incorporated by Dürer into the Triumphal Arch, which Rudolf Wittkower considers "the greatest hieroglyphic monument".

Maximilian's time was an era of international development for cryptography. His premier expert on cryptography was the Abbot Trithemius, who dedicated Polygraphiae libri sex (controversially disguised as a treatise on occult, either because its real target audience was the selected few such as Maximilian or to attract public attention to a tedious field) to the emperor and wrote another work on steganography (Steganographia, posthumously published). As practitioner, Maximilian functioned as the Empire's first cipher expert himself. It was under his reign that proven use of encrypted messages in the German chancellery was first recorded, although it was not as elaborate as the mature Italian and Spanish systems. Maximilian experimented with different encryption methods, even in his private correspondence, often based on the Upper Italian models.

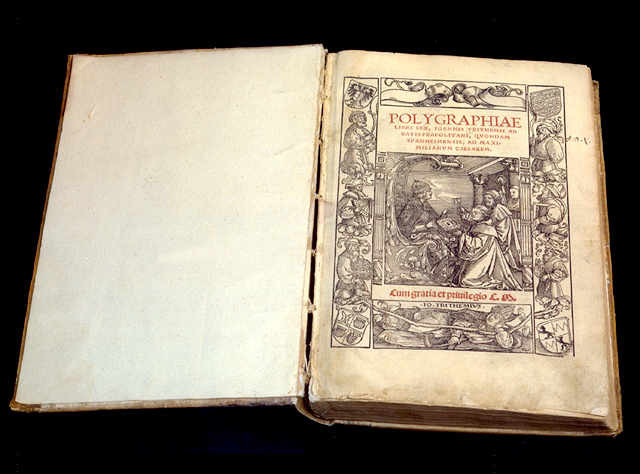
Die Polygraphiae is the first printed work on the topic of cryptography, and also the first comprehensive work on the subject. Title page: Trithemius was presenting his work to Maximilian.

In the fields of history and historiography, Trithemius was also a notable forger and inventive historian who helped to connect Maximilian to Trojan heroes, the Merovingians and the Carolingians. The project had contributions from Maximilian's other court historiographers and genealogists such as Ladislaus Suntheim, Johann Stabius, Johannes Cuspinian and Jakob Mennel. While his colleagues like Jakob Mennel and Ladislaus Suntheim often inserted invented ancient ancestors for the missing links, Trithemius invented entire sources, such as Hunibald (supposedly a Scythian historian), Meginfrid and Wastald. The historiographer Josef Grünpeck wrote the work Historia Friderici III et Maximiliani I (which would be dedicated to Charles V). The first history of Germany based on original sources (patronized by Maximilian and cultivated by Peutinger, Aventin, Pirchkheimer, Stabius, Cuspianian and Celtis) was the Epitome Rerum Germanicarum written by Jakob Wimpheling, in which it was argued that the Germans possessed their own flourishing culture.

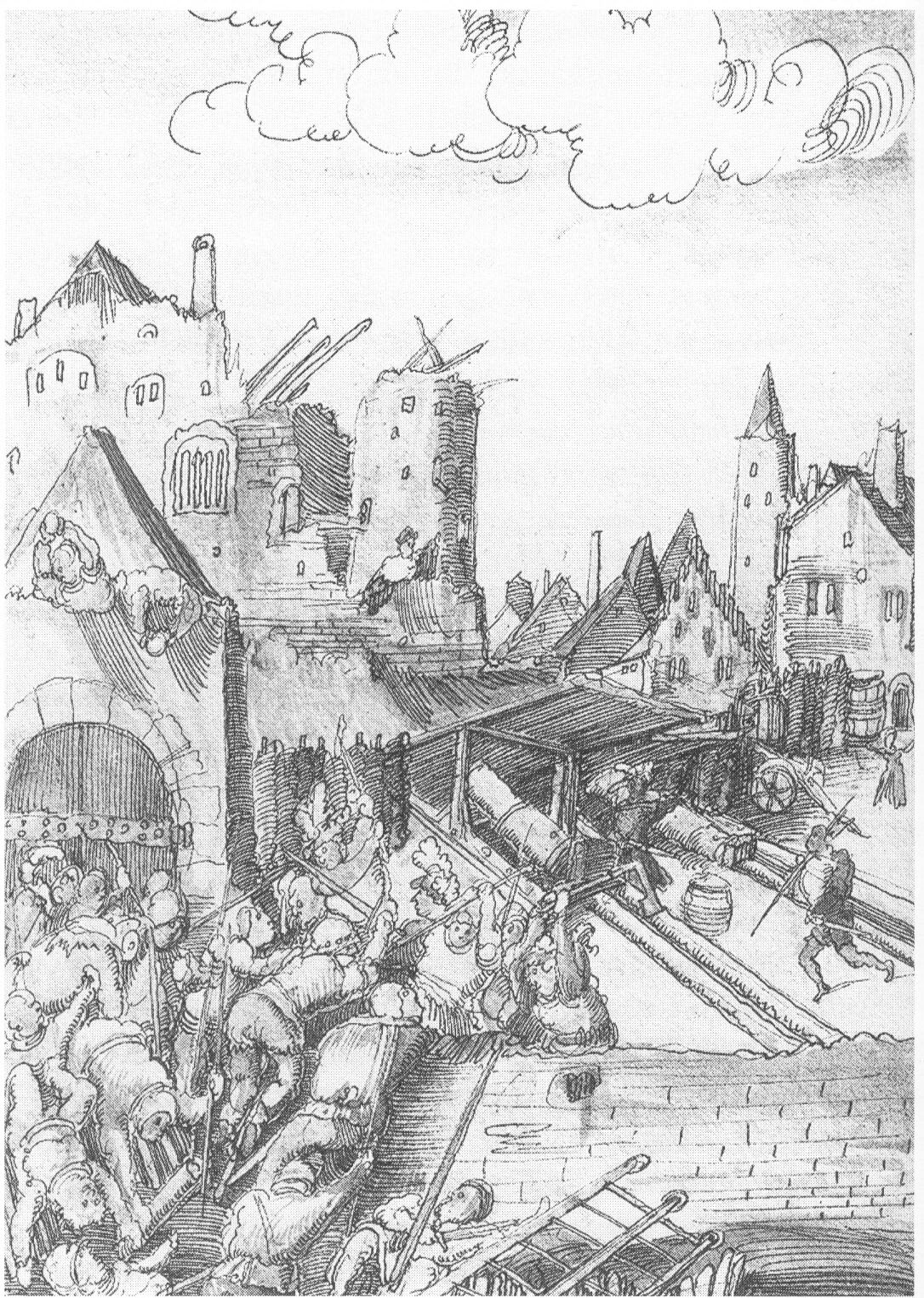
Illustration from Historia Friderici et Maximiliani, 1513–14. The 1462 siege of the Vienna citadel, in which the imperial family resided, by Albert VI, Frederick III's younger brother and Maximilian's uncle.

Maximilian's time was the age of great world chronicles. The most famous and influential is the Nuremberg Chronicle, of which the author, Hartmann Schedel, is usually considered one of the important panegyrists and propagandists, hired and independent, of the emperor and his anti-Ottoman propaganda agenda.

According to Maria Golubeva, Maximilian and his court preferred the fictional settings and reimagination of history (such as the Weisskunig, a "unique mixture of history and heroic romance"), so no outstanding works of historiography (such as those of Molinet and Chastelain at the Burgundian court) were produced. The authors of The Oxford History of Historical Writing: Volume 3: 1400–1800 point out three major distinctives in the historical literature within the imperial circle. The first was genealogical research, which Maximilian elevated to new heights and represented most prominently by the Fürstliche Chronik, written by Jakob Mennel. The second encompassed projects associated with the printing revolution, such as Maximilian's autobiographical projects and Dürer's Triumphal Arch. The third, and also the most sober strain of historical scholarship, constituted "a serious engagement with imperial legacy", with the scholar Johannes Cuspinianus being its most notable representative. Seton-Watson remarks that all his important works show the connection to Maximilian, with the Commentarii de Romanorum Consulibus being "the most profound and critical"; the De Caesaribus et Imperatoribus Romanorum (also considered by Cesc Esteve as his greatest work) possessing the most practical interest, especially regarding Maximilian's life, and the Austria giving a complete history of the nation up to 1519.

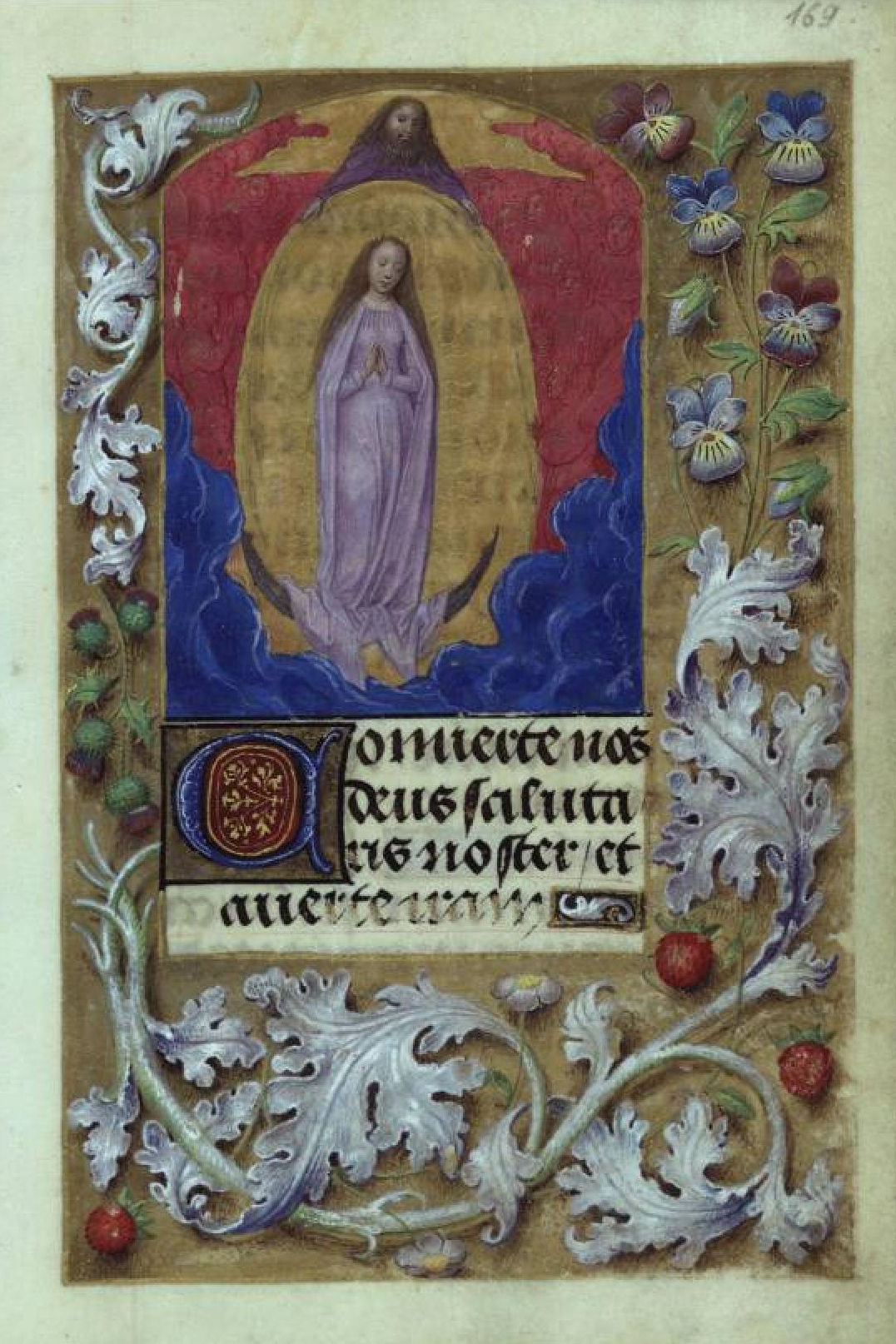
Assumption of the Virgin from the Berlin Book of hours of Mary of Burgundy and Maximilian, Staatliche Museen zu Berlin, Kupferstichkabinett Handschrift 78 B 12 (Photo Credit: Bildarchive Preußischer Kulturbesitz/Art Resource, NY). "And a great sign appeared in heaven: A woman clothed with the sun, and the moon under her feet, and on her head a crown of twelve stars."

He had notable influence on the development of the musical tradition in Austria and Germany as well. Several historians credit Maximilian with playing the decisive role in making Vienna the music capital of Europe. Under his reign, the Habsburg musical culture reached its first high point and he had at his service the best musicians in Europe. He began the Habsburg tradition of supporting large-scale choirs, which he staffed with the brilliant musicians of his days like Paul Hofhaimer, Heinrich Isaac and Ludwig Senfl. His children inherited the parents' passion for music and even in their father's lifetime, supported excellent chapels in Brussels and Mechelen, with masters such as Alexander Agricola, Marbriano de Orto (who worked for Philip), Pierre de La Rue and Josquin Desprez (who worked for Margaret). After witnessing the brilliant Burgundian court culture, he looked to the Burgundian court chapel to create his own imperial chapel. As he was always on the move, he brought the chapel as well as his whole peripatetic court with him. In 1498 though, he established the imperial chapel in Vienna, under the direction of George Slatkonia, who would later become the Bishop of Vienna. Music benefitted greatly through the cross-fertilization between several centres in Burgundy, Italy, Austria and Tyrol (where Maximilian inherited the chapel of his uncle Sigismund).

In the service of Maximilian, Isaac (the first Continental composer who provided music on demand for the monarch-employer) cultivated "the mass-proper genre with an intensity unrivalled anywhere else in Europe". He created a huge cycle of polyphonic Mass Propers, most of which was published posthumously in the collection Choralis Constantinus, printed between 1550 and 1555—David J. Rothenberg comments that, like many of the other artistic projects commissioned (and instilled with Maximilian's bold artistic vision and imperial ideology), it was never completed. A notable artistic monument, seemingly of great symbolic value to the emperor, was Isaac's motet Virgo prudentissima, which affiliated the reigns of two sovereign monarches—the Virgin Mary of Heaven and Maximilian of the Holy Roman Empire. The motet describes the Assumption of the Virgin, in which Mary, described as the most prudent Virgin (allusion to Parable of the Ten Virgins), "beautiful as the moon", "excellent as the sun" and "glowing brightly as the dawn", was crowned as Queen of Heaven and united with Christ, her bridegroom and son, at the highest place in Heaven. Rothenberg opines that Dürer's Festival of the Rose Garlands (see below) was its "direct visual counterpart". The idea was also reflected in the scene of the Assumption seen in the Berlin Book of hours of Mary of Burgundy and Maximilian (commissioned when Mary of Burgundy was still alive, with some images added posthumously).

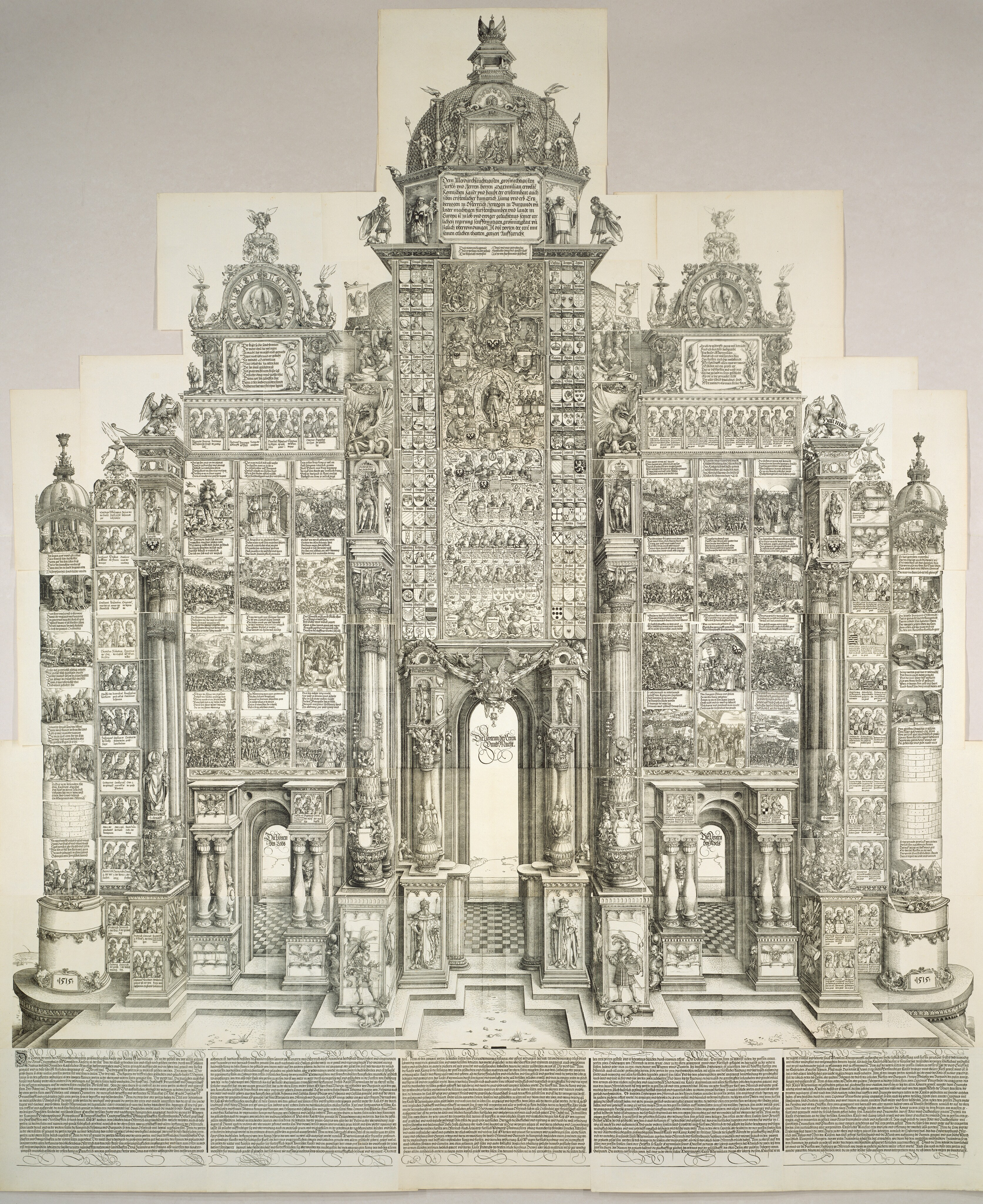
The Triumphal Arch

Among some authors, Maximilian has a reputation as the "media emperor". The historian Larry Silver describes him as the first ruler who realized and exploited the propaganda potential of the print press both for images and texts. The reproduction of the Triumphal Arch (mentioned above) in printed form is an example of art in service of propaganda, made available for the public by the economical method of printing (Maximilian did not have money to actually construct it). At least 700 copies were created in the first edition and hung in ducal palaces and town halls through the Reich.

Historian Joachim Whaley comments that: "By comparison with the extraordinary range of activities documented by Silver, and the persistence and intensity with which they were pursued, even Louis XIV appears a rather relaxed amateur." Whaley notes, though, that Maximilian had an immediate stimulus for his "campaign of self-aggrandizement through public relation": the series of conflicts that involved Maximilian forced him to seek means to secure his position. Whaley further suggests that, despite the later religious divide, "patriotic motifs developed during Maximilian's reign, both by Maximilian himself and by the humanist writers who responded to him, formed the core of a national political culture."

Historian Manfred Hollegger notes though that the emperor's contemporaries certainly did not see Maximilian as a "media emperor": "He achieved little political impact with pamphlets, leaflets and printed speeches. Nevertheless, it is certainly true that he combined brilliantly all the media available at that time for his major literary and artistic projects". Tupu Ylä-Anttila notes that while his daughter (to whom Maximilian entrusted a lot of his diplomacy) often maintained a sober tone and kept a competent staff of advisors who helped her with her letters, her father did not demonstrate such an effort and occasionally sent emotional and erratic letters (the letters of Maximilian and Margaret were often presented to foreign diplomats to prove their trust in each other). Maria Golubeva opines that with Maximilian, one should use the term "propaganda" in the sense suggested by Karl Vocelka: "opinion-making". Also, according to Golubeva, unlike the narrative usually presented by Austrian historians including Wiesflecker, Maximilian's "propaganda", that was associated with 'militarism', universal imperial claims and court historiography, with a tendency towards world domination, was not the simple result of his Burgundian experience—his 'model of political competition' (as shown in his semi-autobiographical works), while equally secular, ignored the negotiable and institutional aspects inherent in the Burgundian model and, at the same time, emphasized top-down decision making and military force.

During Maximilian's reign, with encouragement from the emperor and his humanists, iconic spiritual figures were reintroduced or became notable. The humanists rediscovered the work Germania, written by Tacitus. According to Peter H. Wilson, the female figure of Germania was reinvented by the emperor as the virtuous pacific Mother of Holy Roman Empire of the German Nation. Inheriting the work of Klosterneuburg canons and his father Frederick III, he promoted Leopold III, Margrave of Austria (who had family ties to the emperor), who was canonized in 1485 and became the Patron of Austria in 1506. To maximize the effect that consolidated his rule, the emperor delayed the translation of Leopold's bones for years until he could personally be there.

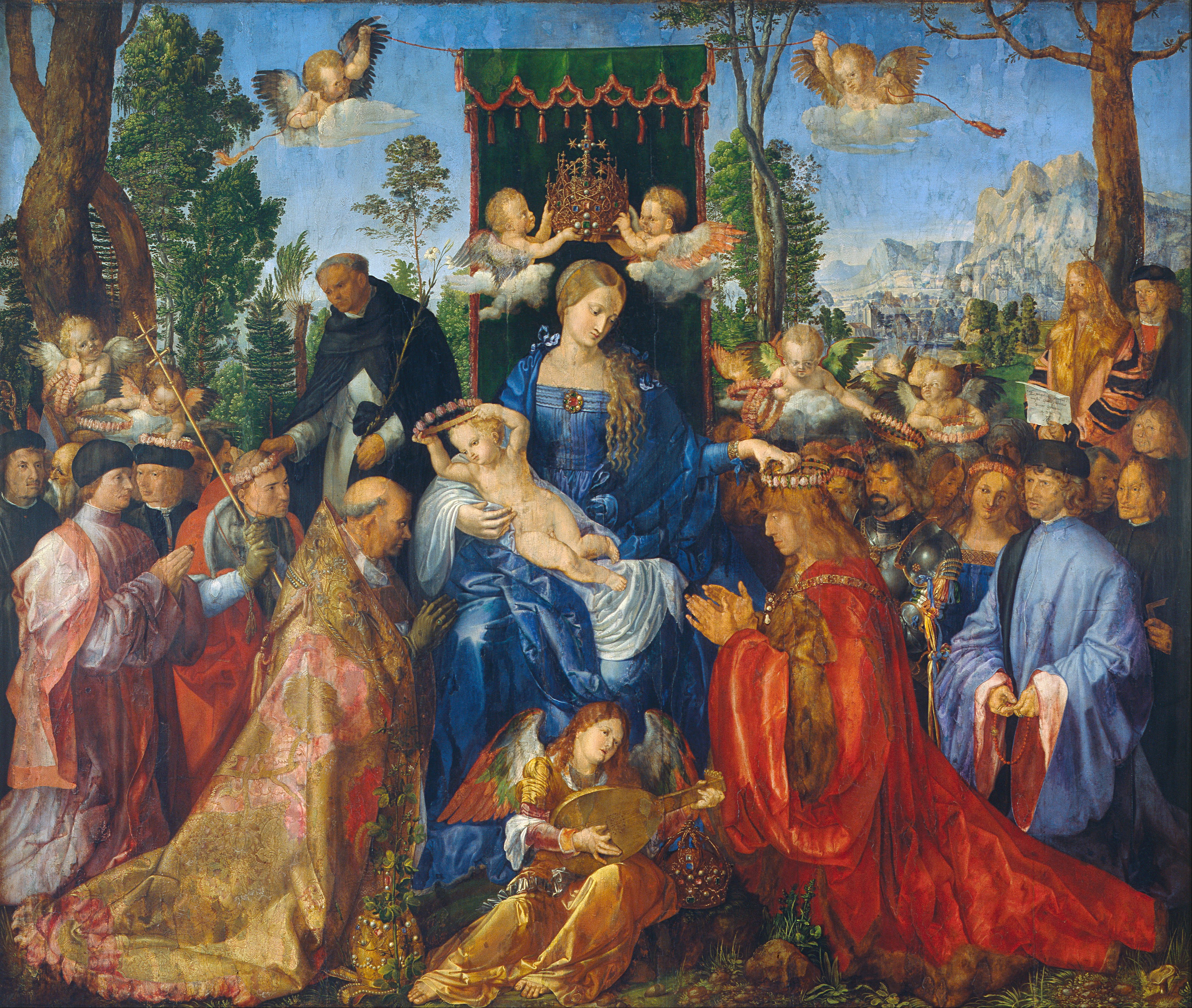
Albrecht Dürer – Feast of the Rosary, 1506. Dürer started the work for the German-speaking community of Venice, who were united as a Fraternity of the Rosary. The figure of the Virgin alludes to Mary of Burgundy while the infant Jesus is associated with Philip the Fair. (Note: "Maximilian and his father Emperor Frederick III were present at the 1475 gathering in Cologne, and were among the first members of the Fraternity of the Rosary. Barely three years later, in 1478, the Burgundian court chronicler Molinet added his allegoric eulogy Le chappellet des dames, in which he placed a symbolic rosary (chappellet) upon the head of Maximilian's first wife Mary. It is in this same allegory that the birth of Philip receives its parallel in the depiction of the baby Jesus in a manger, surrounded by an ox and an ass. The German-speaking community in Venice also united in a Fraternity of the Rosary. It was for this fraternity in 1506 that Dürer began his famous Feast of the Rosary in Augsburg. This painting is extraordinary because of the extreme tenderness with which the Virgin Mary, now in her function as Virgin with Child Enthroned, places a rosary of white and red roses upon the head of Maximilian. In so doing, Dürer made a single entity of the religious and the worldly".) Here the Wise King, or White King, claimed his legitimacy directly from the omnipotent Queen of Heaven, rather than through the mediation of the Church and the Pope.

He promoted the association between his own wife Mary of Burgundy and the Virgin Mary, that had already been started in her lifetime by members of the Burgundian court before his arrival. These activities included the patronage (by Maximilian, Philip the Fair and Charles V) of the devotion of the Seven Sorrows as well as the commission (by Maximilian and his close associates) of various artworks dedicating to the topic such as the famous paintings Feast of the Rosary (1506) and Death of the Virgin (1518, one year before the emperor's death) by Albrecht Dürer, the famous diptych of Maximilian's extended family (after 1515) by Strigel, the Manuscript VatS 160 by the composer Pierre Alamire.

Maximilian's reign witnessed the gradual emergence of the German common language. His chancery played a notable role in developing new linguistic standards. Martin Luther credited Maximilian and the Wettin Elector Frederick the Wise with the unification of German language. Tennant and Johnson opine that while other chanceries have been considered significant and then receded in important when the research direction changes, the chanceries of these two rulers have always been considered important from the beginning. As a part of his influential literary and propaganda projects, Maximilian had his autobiographical works embellished, reworked and sometimes ghostwritten in the chancery itself. He is also credited with a major reform of the imperial chancery office: "Maximilian is said to have caused a standardization and streamlining in the language of his Chancery, which set the pace for chanceries and printers throughout the Empire." The form of written German language he introduced into his chancery was called Maximilian's Chancery Speech (Maximilianische Kanzleisprache) and considered a form of Early New High German. It replaced older forms of written language that were close to Middle High German. This new form was used by the imperial chanceries until the end of the 17th century and therefore also referred to as the Imperial speech.

== Architecture ==
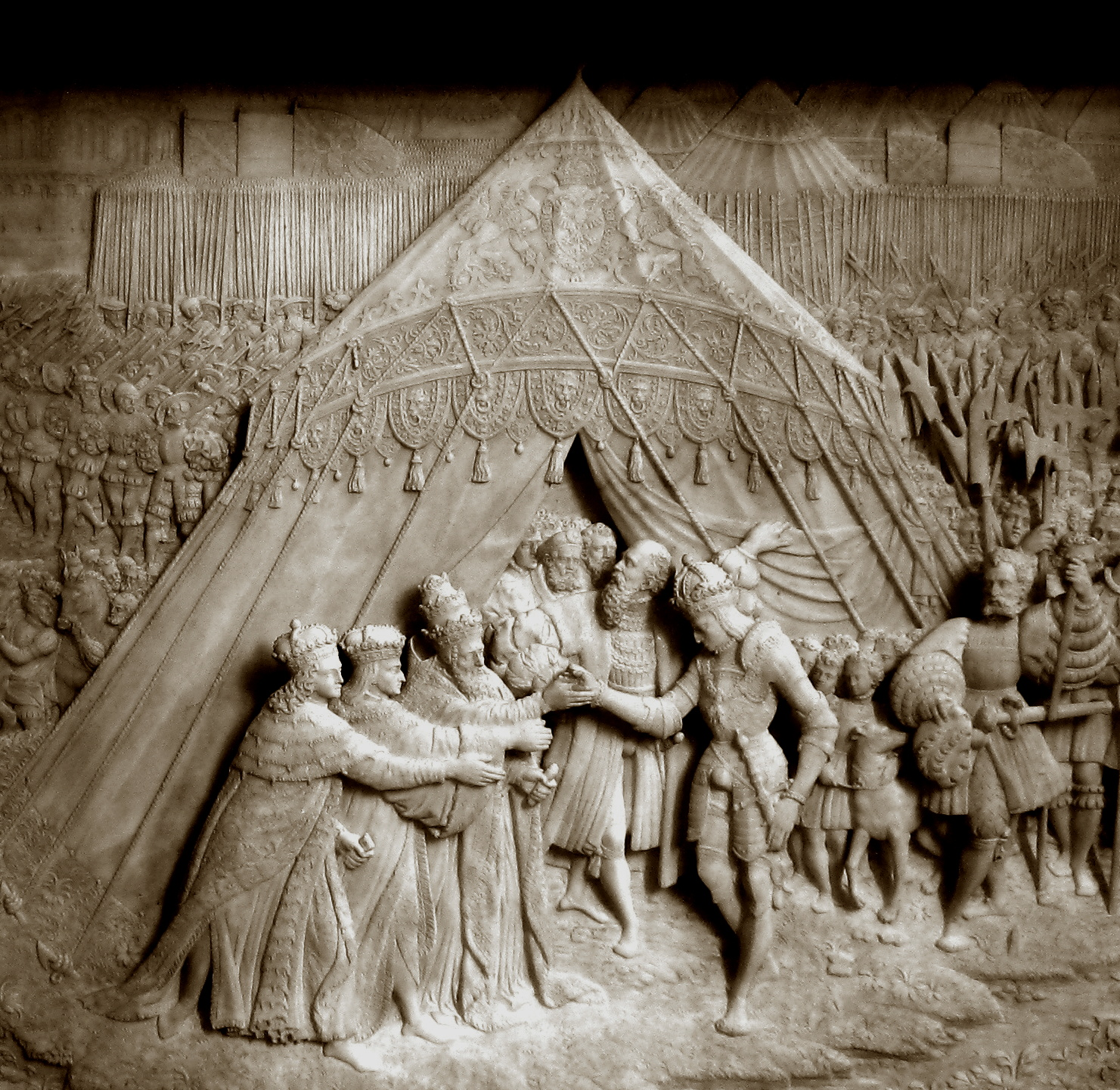
League of Cambrai (1508) as depicted on a bas-relief in the cenotaph

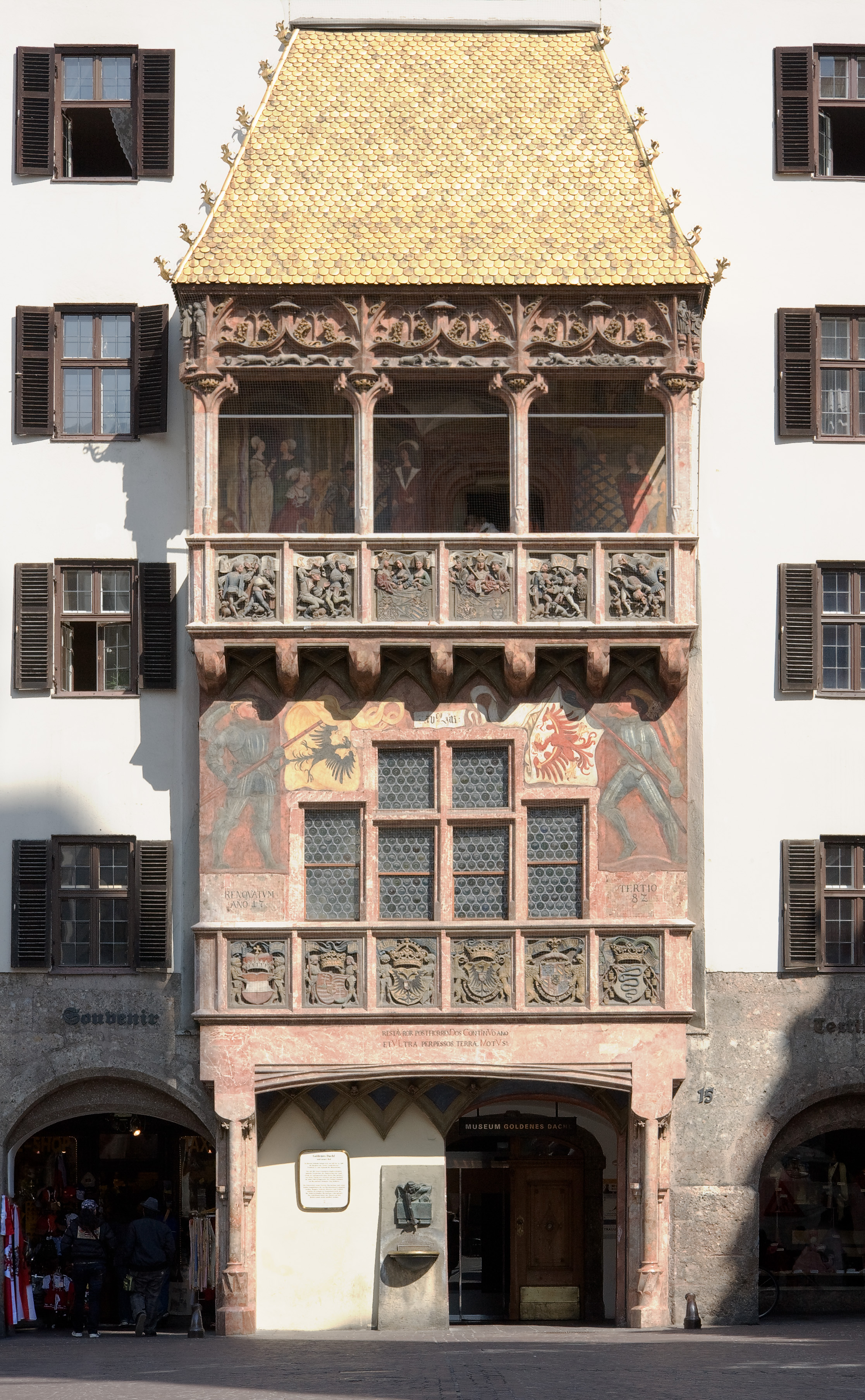
Innsbruck's Golden Roof

Never having much money, Maximilian could not afford large scale building projects. However, he left a few notable constructions, among which the most remarkable is the cenotaph (designed by Maximilian) he began in the Hofkirche, Innsbruck, which was completed long after his death, and has been praised as the most important monument of Renaissance Austria and considered the "culmination of Burgundian tomb tradition" (especially for the groups of statues of family members) that displayed Late Gothic features, combined with Renaissance traditions like reliefs and busts of Roman emperors. The monument was vastly expanded under his grandson Ferdinand I, who added the tumba, the portal, and on the advice of his Vice Chancellor Georg Sigmund Seld, commissioned the 24 marble reliefs based on the images on the Triumphal Arch. The work was only finished under Archduke Ferdinand II. The reliefs were carved by the Flemish sculptor Alexander Colyn while the statues were cast by the bronze-founder Stefan Godl following the designs of Gilg Sesshelschreiber and Jörg Kölderer. The bronze busts of Roman emperors were created by Jörg Muskat.

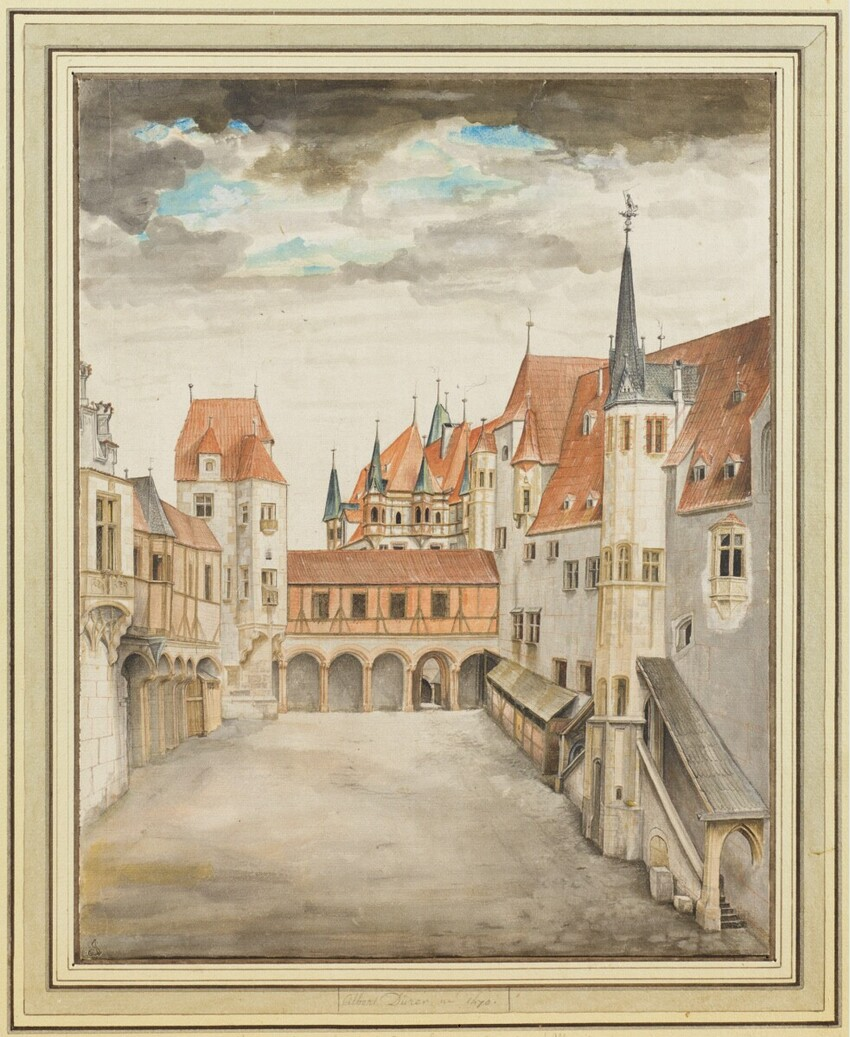
Courtyard of Innsbruck Castle, Albrecht Dürer

After taking Tyrol, in order to symbolize his new wealth and power, he built the Golden Roof, the roof for a balcony overlooking the town center of Innsbruck, from which to watch the festivities celebrating his assumption of rule over Tyrol. The roof is made with gold-plated copper tiles. The structure was a symbol of the presence of the ruler, even when he was physically absent. It began the vogue of using reliefs to decorate oriel windows. The Golden Roof is also considered one of the most notable Habsburg monuments. Like Maximilian's cenotaph, it is in an essentially Gothic idiom. The structure was built by Niclas Türing (Nikolaus Turing) while the paintings was done by Jörg Kölderer.

The Innsbruck Hofburg was redesigned and expanded, chiefly under Niclas Türing. By the time Maximilian died in 1519, the palace was one of the most beautiful and renowned secular structures of the era (but would be rebuilt later in the Baroque style by Maria Theresa). (Note: "Zweifellos ist beim Tod des Kaisers 1519 die Innsbrucker Hofburg eines der schönsten und bedeutendsten Profanwerke jener Epoche gewesen.")

The famous sculpture Schutzmantelmadonna (Virgin of Mercy), donated in 1510 by Maximilian to the Frauenstein Pilgrimage Church in Molln, was a work by Gregor Erhart.

From 1498 onwards, Maximilian caused many castles and palaces in Vienna, Graz, Wiener Neustadt, Innsbruck and Linz to be renovated and modernized. Not only the facade was redesigned and glazed bricks were integrated, Maximilian also paid special attention to the sanitation aspect, issuing precise instructions concerning the "secret chamber", the deflection of waste into a cesspit through pipes and the purification of smells through the use of "herbal essences". In many towns, he caused streets and alleys to be cobbled and added gutters for rain water. He issued regulations that ordered open drains for waste water to be bricked up and forbade the keeping of animals in the towns. It was also ordained that no rubbish was allowed in the streets overnight. Directions related to fire prevention were also issued, leading to fire walls being constructed between the houses and tiled roofs in many towns. In the hereditary lands and Southern Germany, through his financial blessings, there were wooden cities that were transformed into stone ones.

== Modern postal system and printing ==
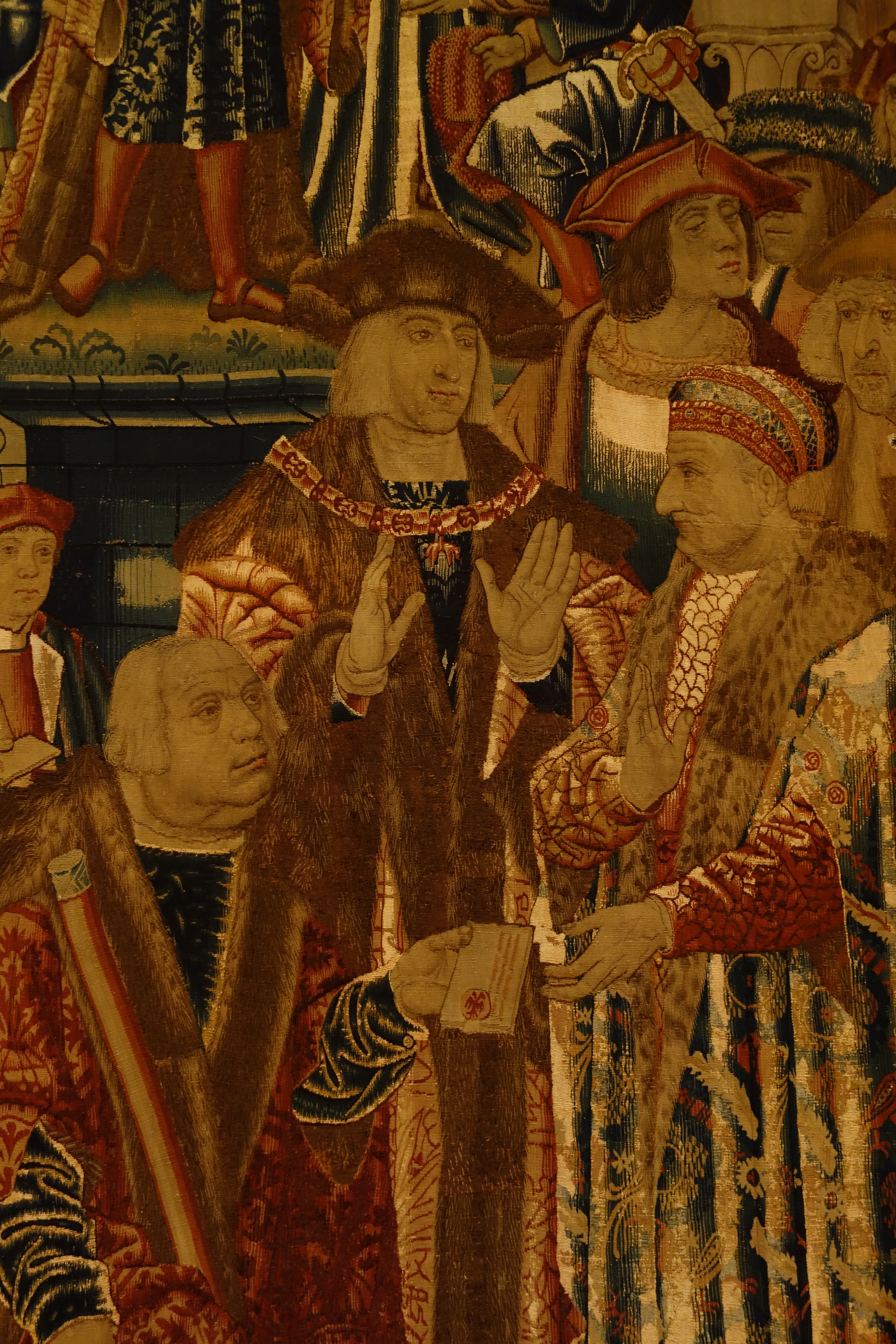
Franz von Taxis received the Postmaster order from Frederick III, Maximilian's father

Together with Franz von Taxis, in 1490, Maximilian developed the first modern postal service in the world. The system was originally built to improve communication between his scattered territories, connecting Burgundy, Austria, Spain and France and later developing to a Europe-wide, fee-based system. Fixed postal routes (the first in Europe) were developed, together with regular and reliable service. From the beginning of the sixteenth century, the system became open to private mail. The initiative was immediately emulated by France and England, although rulers there restricted the spread of private mails and private postal networks. Systematic improvement allowed communication to reach Maximilian, wherever he was, twice as fast as normal, to the point Wolfgang Behringer remarks that "perception of temporal and spatial dimensions was changed". The new development, usually described as the communication revolution, could largely be traced back to Maximilian's initiative, with contributions from Frederick III and Charles the Bold in developing the messenger networks, the Italian courier model and possibly influence from the French model.

The establishment of the postal network also signaled the beginning of a commercial market for news, together with the emergence of commercial newsagents and news agencies, which the emperor actively encouraged. According to Michael Kunczik, he was the first to utilize one-sided battle reports targeting the mass, including the use of the early predecessors of modern newspapers (neue zeitungen).

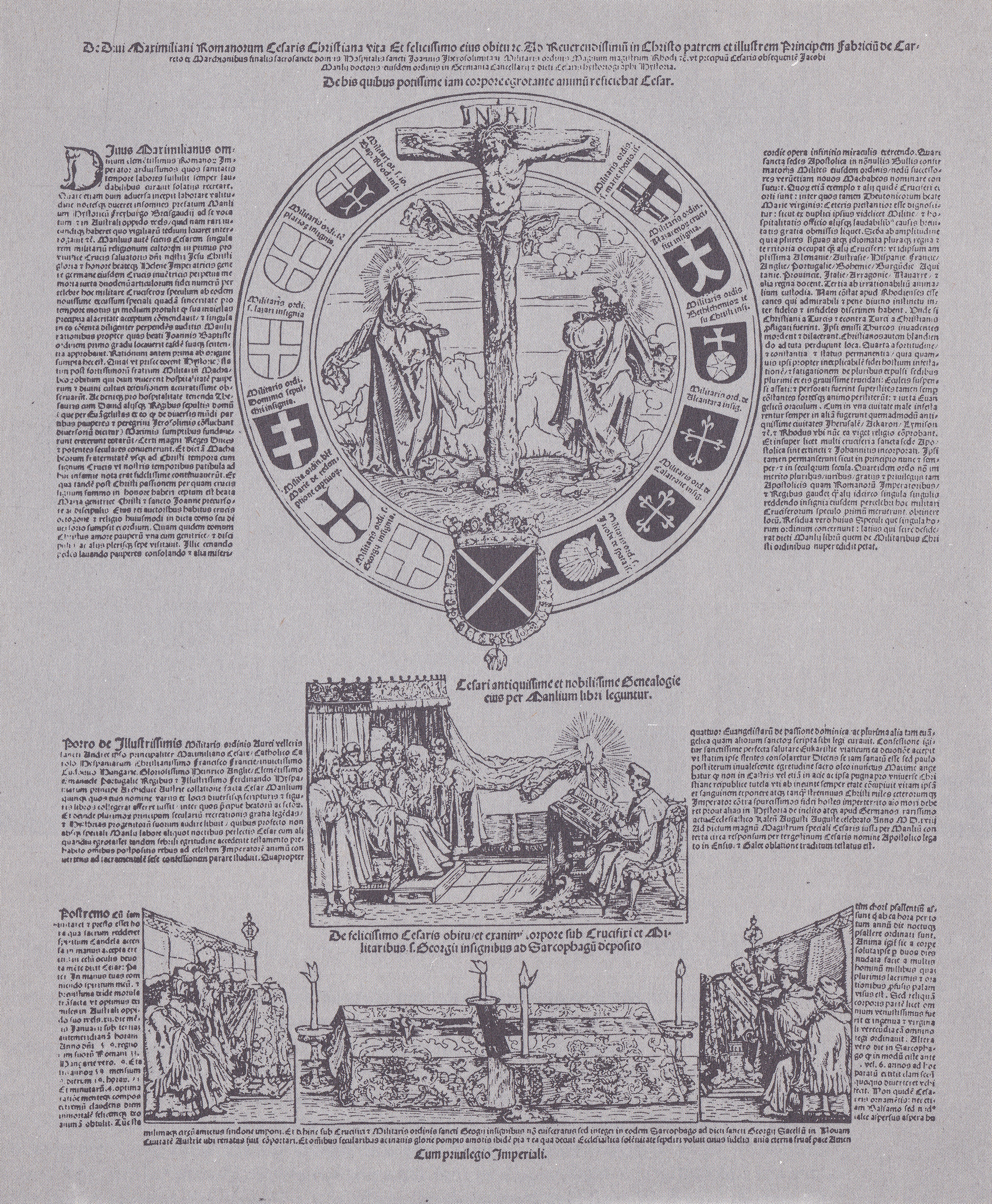
Commemoration print of Maximilian, a flyer created by Hans Weiditz and issued in 1519 after Maximilian's death.

The capital resources he poured into the postage system as well as support for the related printing press (when Archduke, he opened a school for sophisticated engraving techniques) were on a level unprecedented by European monarches, and earned him stern rebuke from the father.

His patronage drew to Augsburg printmakers from the Netherlands (especially from Antwerp) like Jost de Negker and the brothers Cornelis I (died 1528) and Willem Liefrinck, who came there as teens. After his death, as teams dispersed, Negker remained in Augsburg while the Liefrincks returned to their homeland, established there a printmaking dynasty and introduced German-styled workshops. According to Printing Colour 1400–1700: History, Techniques, Functions and Receptions, there was a dramatic drop in both quantity and quality of print projects in Augsburg as a whole once Charles V took over.

The development of the printing press led to a search for a national font. In 1508 or 1510, Maximilian (possibly with Dürer's advice) commissioned the calligrapher Leonhard Wagner to create a new font. Wagner dedicated his calligraphy work Proba centum scripturatum (including one hundred fonts) to Maximilian, who chose the Schwabacher-based font Fraktur, deemed the most beautiful one. While he originally envisioned this font for Latin works, it became the predominant font for German writings, while German printers would use Antiqua for works written in foreign languages. The font would spread to German-influenced countries and remain popular in Germany until being banned in 1941 by the Nazi government as a "Jewish" font. Burgkmair was the chief designer for most of his printing projects. Augsburg was the great center of the printing industry, where the emperor patronized printing and other types of craft through the agency of Conrad Peutinger, giving impetus for the formation of an "imperial" style. Burgkmair and Erhard Ratdolt created new printing techniques. As for his own works, as he wanted to produce the appearance of luxury manuscripts, he mixed handcrafted elements with printing: his Book of Prayers and Theuerdank (Weisskunig and Freydal were unfinished before the emperor's death) were printed with a type that resembled calligraphy (the Imperial Fraktur created by Johannes Schönperger). For prestigious recipients, he used parchment rather than paper. At least one copy of the Book of Hours was decorated by hand by Burgkmair, Dürer, Hans Baldung, Jörg Breu and Cranach.

== Political legacy ==
Maximilian had appointed his daughter Margaret as the Regent of the Netherlands, and she fulfilled this task well. Tupu Ylä-Anttila opines that Margaret acted as de facto queen consort in a political sense, first to her father and then Charles V, "absent rulers" who needed a representative dynastic presence that also complemented their characteristics. Her queenly virtues helped her to play the role of diplomat and peace-maker, as well as guardian and educator of future rulers, whom Maximilian called "our children" or "our common children" in letters to Margaret. This was a model that developed as part of the solution for the emerging Habsburg composite monarchy and would continue to serve later generations.

Through wars and marriages he extended the Habsburg influence in every direction: to the Netherlands, Spain, Bohemia, Hungary, Poland, and Italy. This influence lasted for centuries and shaped much of European history. The Habsburg Empire survived as the Austro-Hungarian Empire until it was dissolved 3 November 1918—399 years 11 months and 9 days after the passing of Maximilian.

Geoffrey Parker summarizes Maximilian's political legacy as follows:

By the time Charles received his presentation copy of Der Weisskunig in 1517, Maximilian could point to four major successes. He had protected and reorganized the Burgundian Netherlands, Whose political future had seemed bleak when he became their ruler forty years earlier. Likewise, he had overcome the obstacles posed by individual institutions, traditions and languages to forge the sub-Alpine lands he inherited from his father into a single state: ‘Austria', ruled and taxed by a single administration that he created at Innsbruck. He had also reformed the chaotic central government of the Holy Roman Empire in ways that, though imperfect, would last almost until its demise three centuries later. Finally, by arranging strategic marriages for his grandchildren, he had established the House of Habsburg as the premier dynasty in central and eastern Europe, creating a polity that his successors would expand over the next four centuries.

The Britannica Encyclopaedia comments on Maximilian's achievements:

Maximilian I [...] made his family, the Habsburgs, dominant in 16th-century Europe. He added vast lands to the traditional Austrian holdings, securing the Netherlands by his own marriage, Hungary and Bohemia by treaty and military pressure, and Spain and the Spanish empire by the marriage of his son Philip [...] Great as Maximilian's achievements were, they did not match his ambitions; he had hoped to unite all of western Europe by reviving the empire of Charlemagne [...] His military talents were considerable and led him to use war to attain his ends. He carried out meaningful administrative reforms, and his military innovations would transform Europe's battlefields for more than a century, but he was ignorant of economics and was financially unreliable.

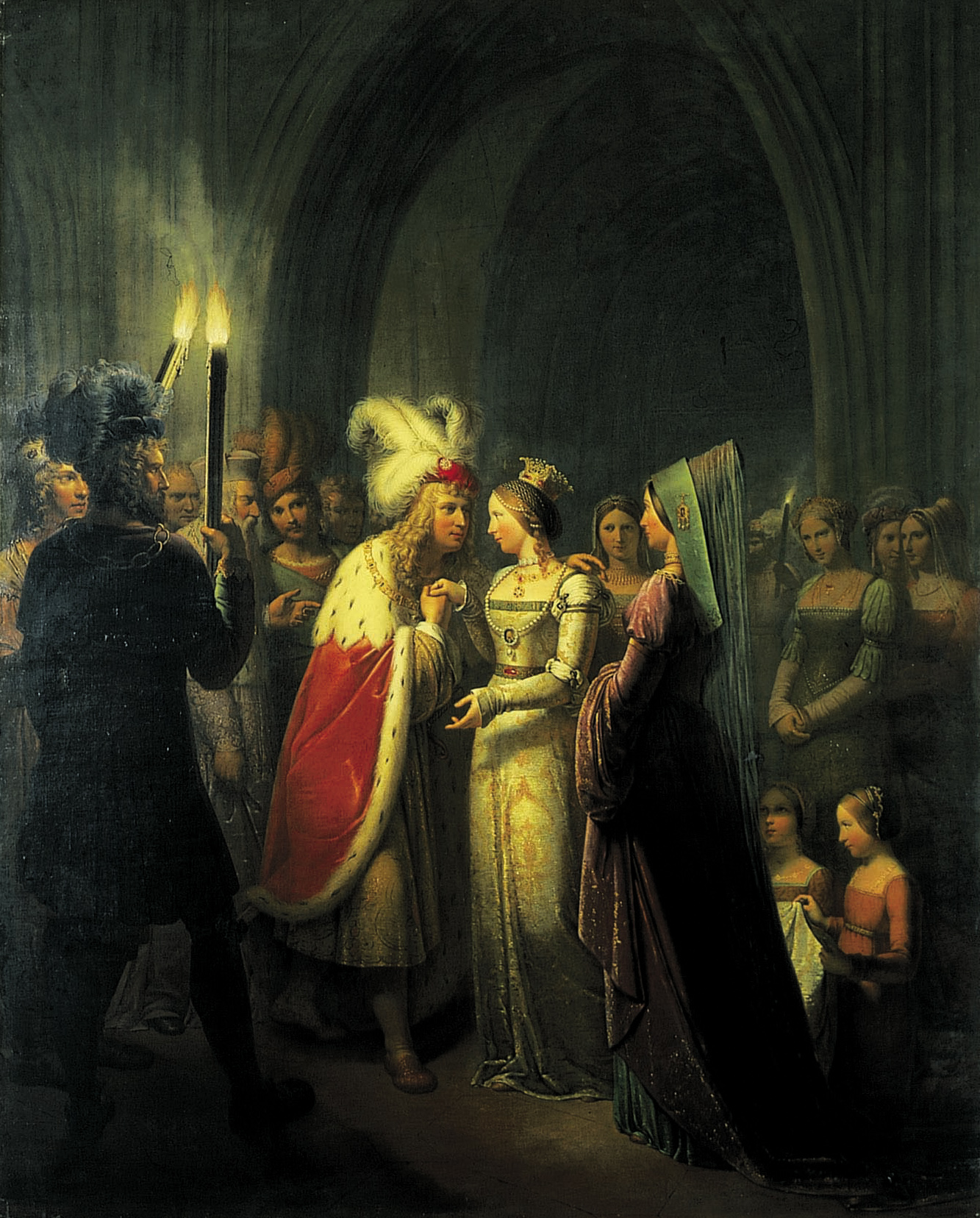
Maximilian and Mary's meeting in Ghent, 1477, monumental painting by Anton Petter and the showpiece of the 2022 Uitbundig Verleden exhibition at the Hof van Busleyden, that attracted top diplomats from Belgium, the Netherlands and Austria. Austrian Ambassador Elisabeth Kornfeind comments that the wedding was the moment "the ties between our countries were formed."

Hollegger notes that, as Maximilian could not persuade his imperial estates to support his plans, he cultivated a system of alliances, in which the germ of modern European powers could be seen—like in the game of chess, no piece could be moved without thinking ahead about the others.

According to Cauchies, it was after the fifteen struggling years of Mary and Maximilian's joint rule and then of Maximilian's sole rule, the state building project first envisioned by the Burgundian dukes showed concrete results: "a consortium of territories nevertheless emerged which found its place in the West under the heirs, Philip the Handsome and Charles V.". Nevertheless, even though an innovative leader of stature, Maximilian's zealous anti-French sentiments (to which, even the Senlis Treaty was a failure), his project of imperial universality and his Habsburg heritage tended to make him out of touch with the Burgundian perspective, as displayed by his son Philip, a peace-loving monarch, and his court (although in his mind, Maximilian probably imagined himself as the true defender of the Low Countries, that inexplicably always rejected him so much). Haemers notes that, for the Dutch, it is impossible to celebrate him the way Germans or Austrians do, even if that is about the troubled feelings Maximilian left and national pride, rather than true reflection of the past.

Hugh Trevor-Roper opines that, although Maximilian's politics and wars accomplished little, "By harnessing the arts, he surrounded his dynasty with a lustrous aura it had previously lacked. It was to this illusion that his successors looked for their inspiration. To them, he was not simply the second founder of the dynasty; he was the creator of its legend—one that transcended politics, nationality, even religion." Paula Sutter Fichtner opines that Maximilian was the author of a "basic but imperfect script for the organization of a Habsburg government now charged with administering a territorial complex that extended far beyond the dynasty's medieval patrimony in central Europe."—He used his revenues profligately for wars. Although aware of the dangers of over-extended credit, in order to protect his borders, imperial prerogatives and advance Habsburg interests, all of which he considered seriously, he could not internalize fiscal discipline. The role of the emperor in the government was very personalized—only when Maximilian's health failed him badly in 1518 did he set up a Hofrat including 18 jurists and nobles from the Empire and Austrian lands to assist him with the responsibilities he was incapable of handling anymore. The alliance between crown and cities for which he laid the foundation never culminated in a southern centralized Habsburg monarchy: the rise of the common man in the crucial years of mid-1250s forced Imperial Cities in Upper Germany to master the Reformation in a way that estranged them from the emperor—a situation which Charles V and Ferdinand were too busy with non-German affairs to manage.

Maximilian's life is still commemorated in Central Europe centuries later. The Order of St. George, which he sponsored, still exists. In 2011, for example, a monument was erected for him in Cortina d'Ampezzo. Also in 1981 in Cormons on the Piazza della Libertà a statue of Maximilian, which was there until the First World War, was put up again. On the occasion of the 500th anniversary of his death there were numerous commemorative events in 2019 at which Karl von Habsburg, the current head of the House of Habsburg, represented the imperial dynasty. A barracks in Wiener Neustadt, Maximilian-Kaserne (formerly Artilleriekaserne), a military base for the Jagdkommando of the Austrian Armed Forces, was named after Maximilian.

Amsterdam still retains close ties with the emperor. His 1484 pilgrimage to Amsterdam boosted the popularity of the Heilige Stede and the city's "miracle industry" to new heights. The city supported him financially in his military expeditions, he granted its citizens the right to use the image of his crown, which remains a symbol of the city as part of its coat-of-arms. The practice survived the later revolt against Habsburg Spain. The central canal in Amsterdam was named in 1615 as the Keizersgracht (Emperor's Canal) after Maximilian. The city beer (Brugse Zot, or The Fools of Bruges) of Bruges, which suffered a four century long decline that was partially inflicted by Maximilian's orders (that required foreign merchants to transfer operations to Antwerp—later he would withdraw the orders but it proved too late.), is associated with the emperor, who according to legend told the city in a conciliatory celebration that they did not need to build an asylum, as the city was full of fools. The swans of the city are considered a perpetual remembrance (allegedly ordered by Maximilian) for Lanchals (whose name meant "long necks" and whose emblem was a swan), the loyalist minister who got beheaded while Maximilian was forced to watch. In Mechelen, Burgundian capital under Margaret of Austria, every 25 years, an ommegang that commemorates Maximilian's arrival as well as other major events is organized.

== Sources ==
- Anderson, Natalie Margaret (March 2017). The Tournament and its Role in the Court Culture of Emperor Maximilian I (1451519) (PDF). The University of Leeds, Institute for Medieval Studies. p. 31. Archived (PDF) from the original on 14 June 2021.
- Anderson, Natalie (2020). "Power and pageantry: the tournament at the court of Maximilian I". The Medieval Tournament as Spectacle: Tourneys, Jousts and Pas D'armes, 1100–1600. Boydell & Brewer. ISBN 978-1-78327-542-7.
- Axelrod, Alan (2013). Mercenaries: A Guide to Private Armies and Private Military Companies. CQ Press. ISBN 978-1-4833-6467-4.
- Beller, Steven (2006). A Concise History of Austria. Cambridge University Press. p. 44. ISBN 978-0-521-47886-1. Archived from the original on 5 October 2021.
- Benecke, Gerhard (2019). Maximilian I (1459–1519): An Analytical Biography. Routledge. pp. 22–26. ISBN 978-1-000-00840-1. Archived from the original on 21 September 2021.
- Berenger, Jean; Simpson, C.A. (2014). A History of the Habsburg Empire 1273–1700. Routledge. pp. 120–121. ISBN 978-1-317-89570-1. Archived from the original on 5 October 2021.
- Brady, Thomas A. Jr. (2009). German Histories in the Age of Reformations, 1400–1650. Cambridge; New York: Cambridge University Press. ISBN 978-0-521-88909-4.
- Buisseret, David (2003). The Mapmakers' Quest: Depicting New Worlds in Renaissance Europe. Oxford: Oxford University Press. ISBN 978-0-19-150090-9.
- Burdick, William Livesey (2004). The Principles of Roman Law and Their Relation to Modern Law. The Lawbook Exchange, Ltd. pp. 19–20. ISBN 978-1-58477-253-8.
- Cauchies, Jean-Marie (2003). Philippe le Beau: le dernier duc de Bourgogne (in French). Brepols. ISBN 978-2-503-51226-6.
- Curtis, Benjamin (2013). The Habsburgs: The History of a Dynasty. Bloomsbury. pp. 46–52. ISBN 978-1-4411-0053-5. Archived from the original on 21 September 2021.
- Cuyler, Louise (1973). The Emperor Maximilian I and Music. Oxford University Press. ISBN 978-0-19-315223-6.
- Emmerson, Richard K. (2013). Key Figures in Medieval Europe: An Encyclopedia. Routledge. ISBN 978-1-136-77518-5.
- Fichtner, Paula Sutter (2014). The Habsburgs: Dynasty, Culture and Politics. Reaktion Books. ISBN 978-1-78023-314-7.
- Fichtner, Paula Sutter (2017). The Habsburg Monarchy, 1490–1848: Attributes of Empire. Macmillan International Higher Education. ISBN 978-1-137-10642-1.
- Gold, Penny Schine; Sax, Benjamin C. (2000). Cultural Visions: Essays in the History of Culture. Rodopi. ISBN 978-90-420-0490-0.
- Golubeva, Maria (2013). Models of Political Competence: The Evolution of Political Norms in the Works of Burgundian and Habsburg Court Historians, c. 1470–1700. Brill. ISBN 978-90-04-25074-1.
- Grössing, Sigrid-Maria (2002). Maximilian I.: Kaiser, Künstler, Kämpfer (in German). Amalthea. ISBN 978-3-85002-485-3.
- Hare, Christopher (1913). Maximilian the Dreamer: Holy Roman Emperor, 1459–1519. Strand, W.C.: Stanley Paul & Co.
- Hayton, Darin (2015). The Crown and the Cosmos: Astrology and the Politics of Maximilian I. University of Pittsburgh Press. ISBN 978-0-8229-8113-8.
- Holland, Clive (1909). Tyrol and Its People. Methuen and Company.
- Hollegger, Manfred (2012). "Personality and reign The biography of Emperor Maximilian I". In Michel, Eva; Sternath, Maria Luise (eds.). Emperor Maximilian I and the Age of Durer (PDF). Prestel; Albertina. ISBN 978-3-7913-5172-8. Archived (PDF) from the original on 21 October 2021.
- Jecmen, Gregory; Spira, Freyda (2012). Imperial Augsburg: Renaissance Prints and Drawings, 1475–1540. Ashgate Publishing, Ltd. ISBN 978-1-84822-122-2.
- Kahl, Christian (2018). Lehrjahre eines Kaisers – Stationen der Persönlichkeitsentwicklung Karls V. (1500–1558): eine Betrachtung habsburgischer Fürstenerziehung/-bildung zum Ende des Mittelalters (PDF) (Thesis). Universität Trier. pp. 65–66. doi:10.25353/ubtr-xxxx-e013-d28d. Archived (PDF) from the original on 9 October 2022.
- Kelber, Moritz (2018). Die Musik bei den Augsburger Reichstagen im 16. Jahrhundert (PDF). Allitera Verlag. ISBN 978-3-96233-095-8. Archived (PDF) from the original on 2 June 2021.
- Kleinschmidt, Harald (2008). Ruling the Waves: Emperor Maximilian I, the Search for Islands and the Transformation of the European World Picture c. 1500. Antiquariaat Forum. p. 162. ISBN 978-90-6194-020-3. Archived from the original on 12 May 2016.
- Kurzmann, Gerhard (1985). Kaiser Maximilian I. und das Kriegswesen der österreichischen Länder und des Reiches (in German). Österreichischer Bundesverlag. ISBN 978-3-215-06067-0.
- Michel, Eva; Sternath, Maria Luise, eds. (2012). Emperor Maximilian I and the age of Dürer (PDF). München: Prestel. ISBN 978-3-7913-5172-8. Archived (PDF) from the original on 21 October 2021.
- Müller, Jan-Dirk; Ziegeler, Hans-Joachim (2015). Maximilians Ruhmeswerk: Künste und Wissenschaften im Umkreis Kaiser Maximilians I. (in German). Walter de Gruyter. ISBN 978-3-11-038754-4.
- Noflatscher, Heinz (2011). Maximilian I. (1459–1519): Wahrnehmung – Übersetzungen – Gender (in German). StudienVerlag. p. 245. ISBN 978-3-7065-4951-6.
- Noflatscher, Heinz (2013). "Von Maximilian zu Karl V. Der Fall »Burgund-Österreich«" [From Maximilian to Charles V. The case of »Burgundy-Austria«]. In Paravicini, Werner; Hiltmann, Torsten; Viltart, Frank (eds.). La cour de Bourgogne et l'Europe. Le rayonnement et les limites d'un mode'le culturel; Actes du colloque international tenu à Paris les 9, 10 et 11 octobre 2007 [The Court of Burgundy and Europe. The influence and limits of a cultural model; Proceedings of the international symposium held in Paris on October 9, 10 and 11, 2007] (PDF) (in German). Deutschen Historischen Institut Paris. pp. 721–743. Archived (PDF) from the original on 9 October 2022.
- Pavlac, Brian A. (2013). "Maximilian I". Key Figures in Medieval Europe: An Encyclopedia. Routledge. ISBN 978-1-136-77519-2.
- Potter, Philip J. (2014). Monarchs of the Renaissance: The Lives and Reigns of 42 European Kings and Queens. McFarland. ISBN 978-0-7864-9103-2.
- Puype, Jan Piet (2020). "Wilfried Tittmann, Die Nürnberger Handfeuerwaffen vom Spätmittelalter bis zum Frühbarock: Der Beitrag Nürnbergs zur Militärischen Revolution der frühen Neuzeit" [The Portable Firearms of Nuremberg from the Late Middle Ages to the Early Modern Age]. Book Review. Arms & Armour. Graz: Akademische Druck- und Verlagsanstalt: 213–218. doi:10.1080/17416124.2020.1791406. S2CID 227060405.
- Rothenberg, David J. (January 2011). "The Most Prudent Virgin and the Wise King:Isaac's Virgo prudentissima Compositions in the Imperial Ideology of Maximilian I". Journal of Musicology. 28 (1): 34–80. doi:10.1525/jm.2011.28.1.34.
- Seton-Watson, Robert William (1902). Maximilian I, Holy Roman Emperor : Stanhope historical essay 1901. Westminster: Archibald Constable & Co.
- Silver, Larry (2008). Marketing Maximilian: The Visual Ideology of a Holy Roman Emperor. Princeton University Press. ISBN 978-0-691-13019-4.
- Silver, Larry; Smith, Jeffrey Chipps (2011). The Essential Durer. University of Pennsylvania Press. ISBN 978-0-8122-0601-2.
- Terjanian, Pierre, ed. (2019). The Last Knight: The Art, Armor, and Ambition of Maximilian I. Metropolitan Museum of Art. ISBN 978-1-58839-674-7.
- Thornhill, Chris (2007). German Political Philosophy: The Metaphysics of Law. Routledge. p. 12. ISBN 978-1-134-38280-4.
- Haivry, Ofir (2017). John Selden and the Western Political Tradition. Cambridge University Press. p. 118. ISBN 978-1-107-01134-2.
- Trevor-Roper, Hugh (2017). Maximilian I. New Word City. ISBN 978-1-64019-024-5.
- Van der Heide, Klaas (2019). "Many Paths Must a Choirbook Tread Before it Reaches the Pope?". Medieval & Early Modern Music from the Low Countries. 11 (1–2): 47–70. doi:10.1484/J.JAF.5.118980. S2CID 213740615.
- Waas, Glenn Elwood (1966) [Originally published: New York, Columbia University Press, 1941]. The Legendary Character of Kaiser Maximilian. New York: AMS Press. OCLC 1077977730.
- Weaver, Andrew H. (2020). A Companion to Music at the Habsburg Courts in the Sixteenth and Seventeenth Centuries. Brill. ISBN 978-90-04-43503-2.
- Whaley, Joachim (March 2009). "Larry Silver. Marketing Maximilian: the Visual Ideology of a Holy Roman Emperor. Princeton University Press, 2008. xii + 303 pp. $49.95, cloth, ISBN 978-0-691-13019-4". H-Net Reviews. Archived from the original on 21 September 2021.
- Whaley, Joachim (2011). Germany and the Holy Roman Empire: Volume II: The Peace of Westphalia to the Dissolution of the Reich, 1648–1806. Oxford: Oxford University Press. ISBN 978-0-19-162822-1.
- Whaley, Joachim (2012). Germany and the Holy Roman Empire: Volume I: Maximilian I to the Peace of Westphalia, 1493–1648. Oxford: Oxford University Press. ISBN 978-0-19-873101-6.
- Wiesflecker, Hermann (1971). Kaiser Maximilian I.: Jugend, burgundisches Erbe und Römisches Königtum bis zur Alleinherrschaft, 1459–1493 (in German). R. Oldenbourg. ISBN 978-3-486-47391-9.
- Wiesflecker, Hermann (1999). Österreich im Zeitalter Maximilians I.: die Vereinigung der Länder zum frühmodernen Staat : der Aufstieg zur Weltmacht (in German). Verlag für Geschichte und Politik. ISBN 978-3-7028-0363-6.
- Wilson, Peter H. (2016). Heart of Europe: A History of the Holy Roman Empire. Belknap Press. ISBN 978-0-674-05809-5.
- Wood, Christopher S. (2008). Forgery, Replica, Fiction: Temporalities of German Renaissance Art. University of Chicago Press. ISBN 978-0-226-90597-6.
- Ylä-Anttila, T (December 2019). Habsburg Female Regents in the Early 16th Century (PDF) (PhD thesis). University of Helsinki. pp. 1–25, 71. ISBN 978-951-51-5701-0. Archived (PDF) from the original on 25 October 2021.
