= Arms of Skanderbeg =

Surviving helmet and swords of Skanderbeg

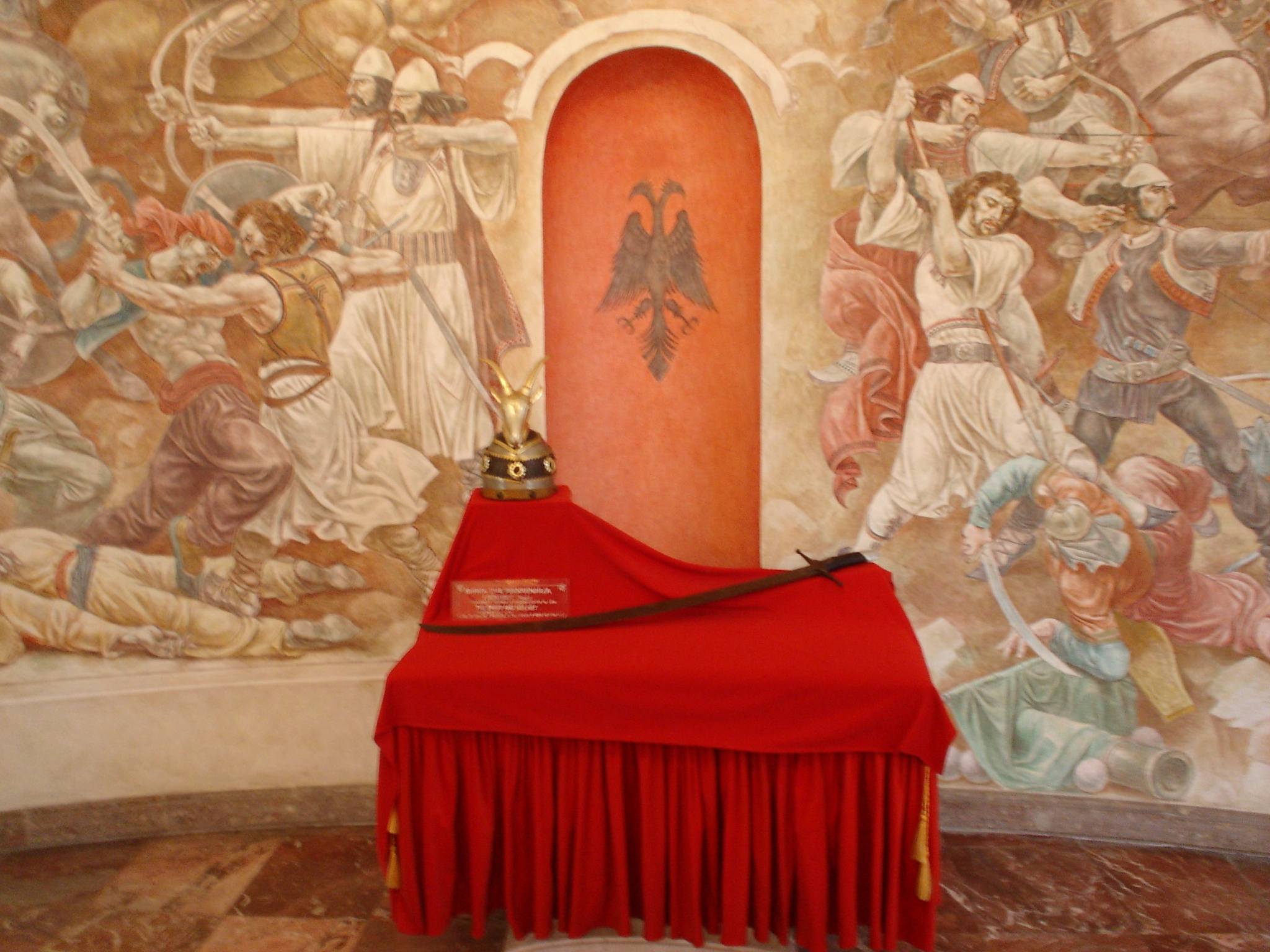
Replica of the Arms of Skanderbeg at the Museum of Kruja

Skanderbeg (Albanian: Skënderbeu) was a prominent figure in the history of Albania. His weapons have been subjects of mythical adoration. According to legends, his sword was so heavy that only his arm could wield it. It was also said to be so sharp that it could slice a man vertically from head to waist with little effort and cut a huge boulder in half with a single blow.

Of all of Skanderbeg's belongings, only four objects remain: two swords, a helmet, and a prayer book. Currently, the weapons (helmet and swords) are on display in the Imperial Armoury at the Weltmuseum Wien, but it's a collection of the Kunsthistorisches Museum in Vienna, after having passed through the hands of countless noblemen since the 15th century when they were first brought over to Italy from Albania by Skanderbeg’s wife, Donika Kastrioti. The prayer book is archived at the Shelley Publishing House in Chelsea, London in England.

== The sword ==
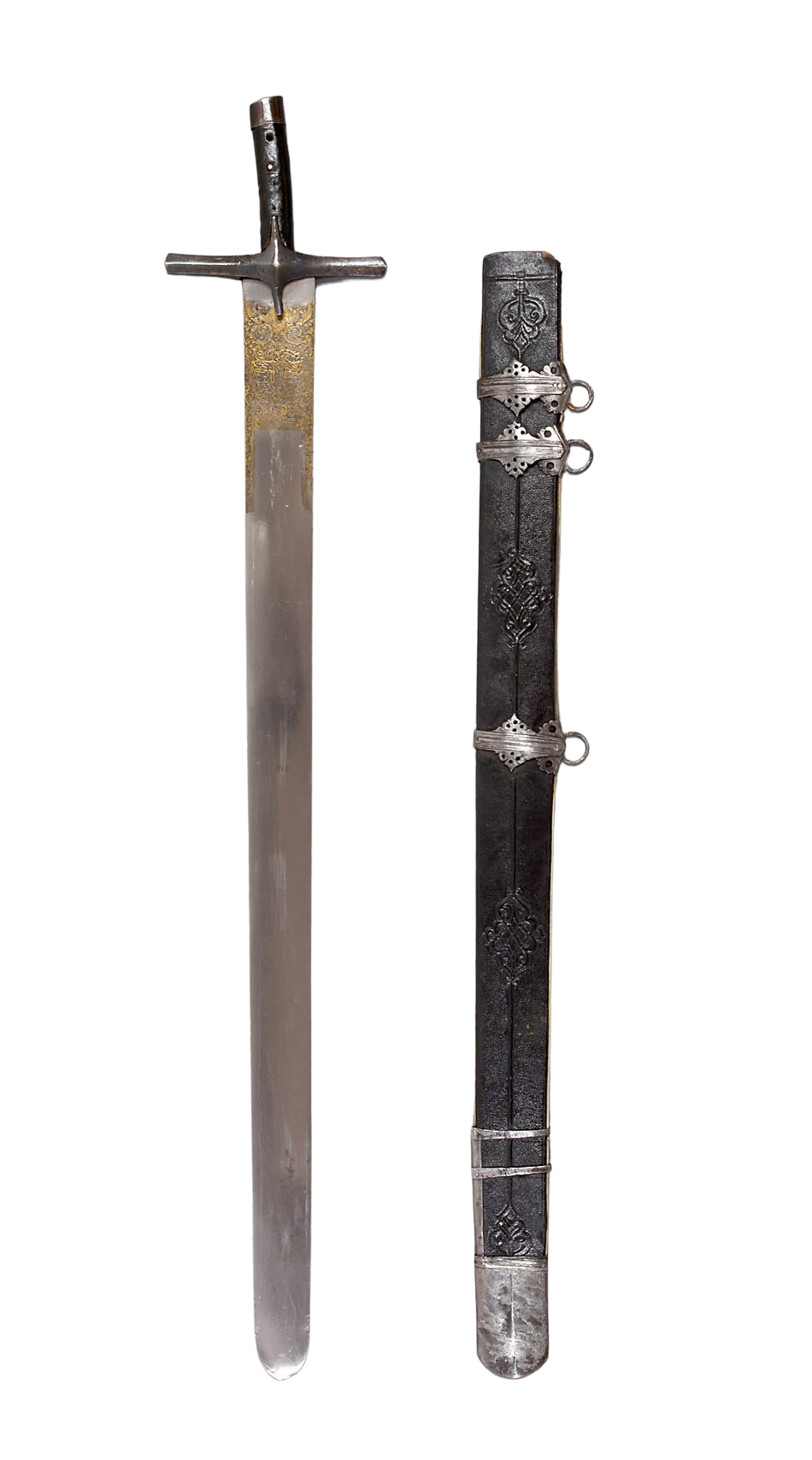
The sword and scabbard of Skanderbeg are currently on display at the Kunsthistorischen Museum in Vienna, Austria.

According to Dhimitër Frëngu, Skanderbeg's scribe and one of his biographers, the first sword was curved (In the original Italian: una scimitarra storta), with a sharp edge and elegantly made of Damascened steel. Some accounts report that at one point he kept two swords sheathed in the same scabbard. Frengu then adds, rather colourfully, that Skanderbeg brought a master sword-maker over from Italy, who produced three better swords for him. One of them, "that could cut through steel," he sent it as a present to the Ottoman Sultan. It is also known that in Skanderbeg's last visit to the Holy See, Pope Paul II presented the Albanian hero with a sword and a cap (It: una spada ed un elmo).

The straight sword, which lies at the Museum of Ambras along with the helmet, is double-edged. The blade is dressed in gold. It is 85.5 centimeters long, 5.7 cm wide, and weighs 1.3 kilograms. Its scabbard is made of leather. According to Faik Konica, who viewed the sword at the beginning of the 20th century, there were still stains of blood on the blade.

On the other hand, the curved sword, including the hilt, measures 121 cm in length and weighs 3.2 kg. This sword is fashioned after Ottoman styles of the time, and just as Dhimiter Frengu reported five centuries earlier, is a damascene steel, highly ornamented. There is an inscription in Turkish. The inscription reads: (Libehadur Allah Iskander beg – Champion of God, Skanderbeg). The hilt, dressed in silver, and the velvet scabbard belong to a subsequent time. Both swords were reproduced in Vienna, for exclusive display in Tirana.

Of these two swords, the one which Skanderbeg used in times of war could have been the curved one. The straight sword was rather short for his tall frame, whereas the other one afforded the flexibility required for cavalry charges and the fighting style of the day. In addition, having been trained in Turkey, and having learned there his skills in martial arts, it is more likely that he would have been more comfortable with that sword.

== The helmet ==
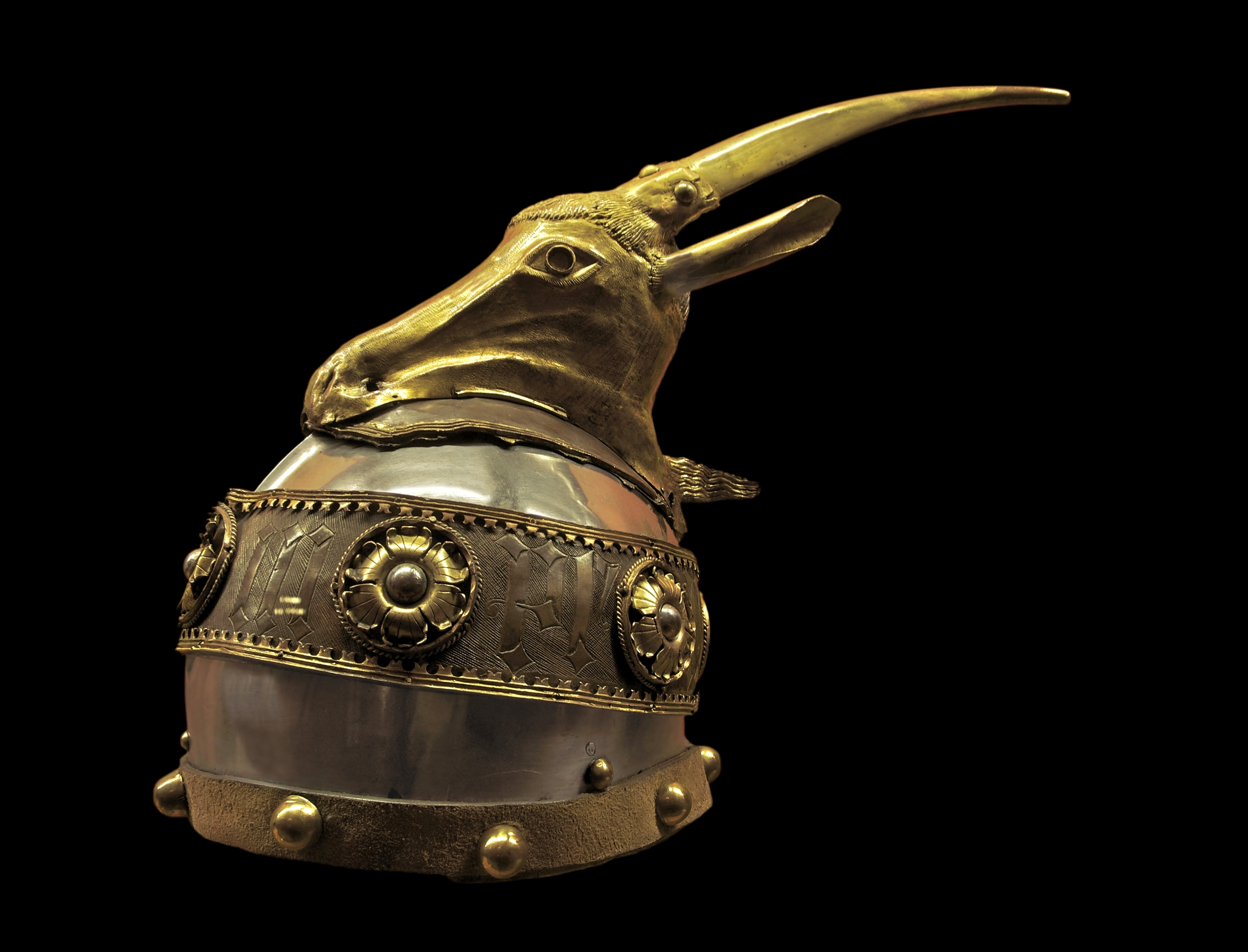
The helmet of Skanderbeg.

Skanderbeg’s helmet is made of white metal, adorned with a strip dressed in gold. On its top lies the head of a horned goat made of bronze, also dressed in gold. The bottom part bears a copper strip adorned with a monogram separated by rosettes ✽ IN ✽ PE ✽ RA ✽ TO ✽ RE ✽ BT ✽, which means: Jhezus Nazarenus ✽ Principi Emathie ✽ Regi Albaniae ✽ Terrori Osmanorum ✽ Regi Epirotarum ✽ Benedictat Te (Jesus Nazarene Blesses Thee [Skanderbeg], Prince of Emathia (since he was named after Alexander the Great), King of Albania, Terror of the Ottomans, King of Epirus). It is thought that the copper strip with the monogram is the work of the descendants of Skanderbeg and was placed there by them, as Skanderbeg never held any other title but "Lord of Albania" (Latin: Dominus Albaniae): it should be said however that the correct Latin translation of Regi is Kingdom since it is Rex that refers to King. Thus the inscriptions on the helmet may refer to the unsettled name by which Albania was known at the time, as a means to identify Skanderbeg's leadership over all Albanians across regional denominative identifications. Contemporary sources show that 14th-century Albanians were invariably identified as tribal people, with no state of their own. Thus, depending on where they lived – North or South, in the plains or the mountains, and to which civilization they subscribed to – we have Turkish: Arnaut, old Serbian: Arbanas, Italian: Albanian, Epirotarum, Albanensis, Albanian: Arber, Arben, Arberesh. According to a report by historian Shefqet Pllana, Sami Frasheri in his Kamus-al-Alam maintains that the wording "Dhu lKarnejn" (owner of the two horns) was an appellative attributed to Alexander the Great of Macedon, the very name which Skanderbeg bore in the Islamic form. At the request of the pre-WWII Albanian government, an identical copy of the helmet of Skanderbeg lies now in the National Museum of Tirana, Albania. The copy was manufactured by an Austrian master in 1937.

The helmet is depicted on the reverse of the Albanian 5000 lekë banknote, issued since 1996.

== The long journey of the weapons ==
The helmet and swords have a dark and confusing history. After the death of Skanderbeg, they were taken to Italy by Skanderbeg’s wife Donika and his son Gjon. Who inherited them after their death is unknown. The weapons reappeared in the last decade of the 16th century. By 1590 the helmet and one sword were under the ownership of Count Eolfang of Sturnberg while the other sword lay in the inventory of the Arms Museum of the Archduke Karl of Styria, son of the Holy Roman Emperor in Graz, Austria (they appear in the inventory of 30 October 1590). The person who brought the weapons together was the son of the Emperor and brother of Karl, Archduke Ferdinand of Tyrol, who, acting under the advice of his Chancellor Jacob Schrenk von Notzing, bought the weapons and brought them under the same roof. Later, this prince erected the Museum of Ambras, near Tyrol, which he filled with all sorts of war-related material, as well as paintings and portraits of celebrities of that age. In 1806 the weapons were transferred to the Imperial Museum in Vienna, still apart from each other. The helmet and the straight sword were placed in the Maximilian Hall (hall XXV, no. 71 & 92 respectively), whereas the curved sword found its way to the Karl V Hall (hall XXVII, no. 345). The weapons were separated by the curators of the museum, who were uncertain whether or not the swords indeed belonged to Skanderbeg. After the Second World War, the doubts evaporated. On the eve of Skanderbeg’s 500th anniversary, the arms were reunited, not only in the same hall but in the same display window of the Imperial Armoury in Vienna.

== In Albania ==
The arms were returned to Albania in November 2012 as part of the 100th Anniversary of the Independence of Albania, then were brought back to Austria.

== Sources ==
- Anamali, Skënder (2002), Historia e popullit shqiptar në katër vëllime (in Albanian), vol. I, Botimet Toena, OCLC 52411919
- Kristo Frasheri, Skenderbeu: Jeta dhe Vepra (Tirane: Botimet Toena, 2002), 258-263
