= Owl on a Frog =

17th century sculpture

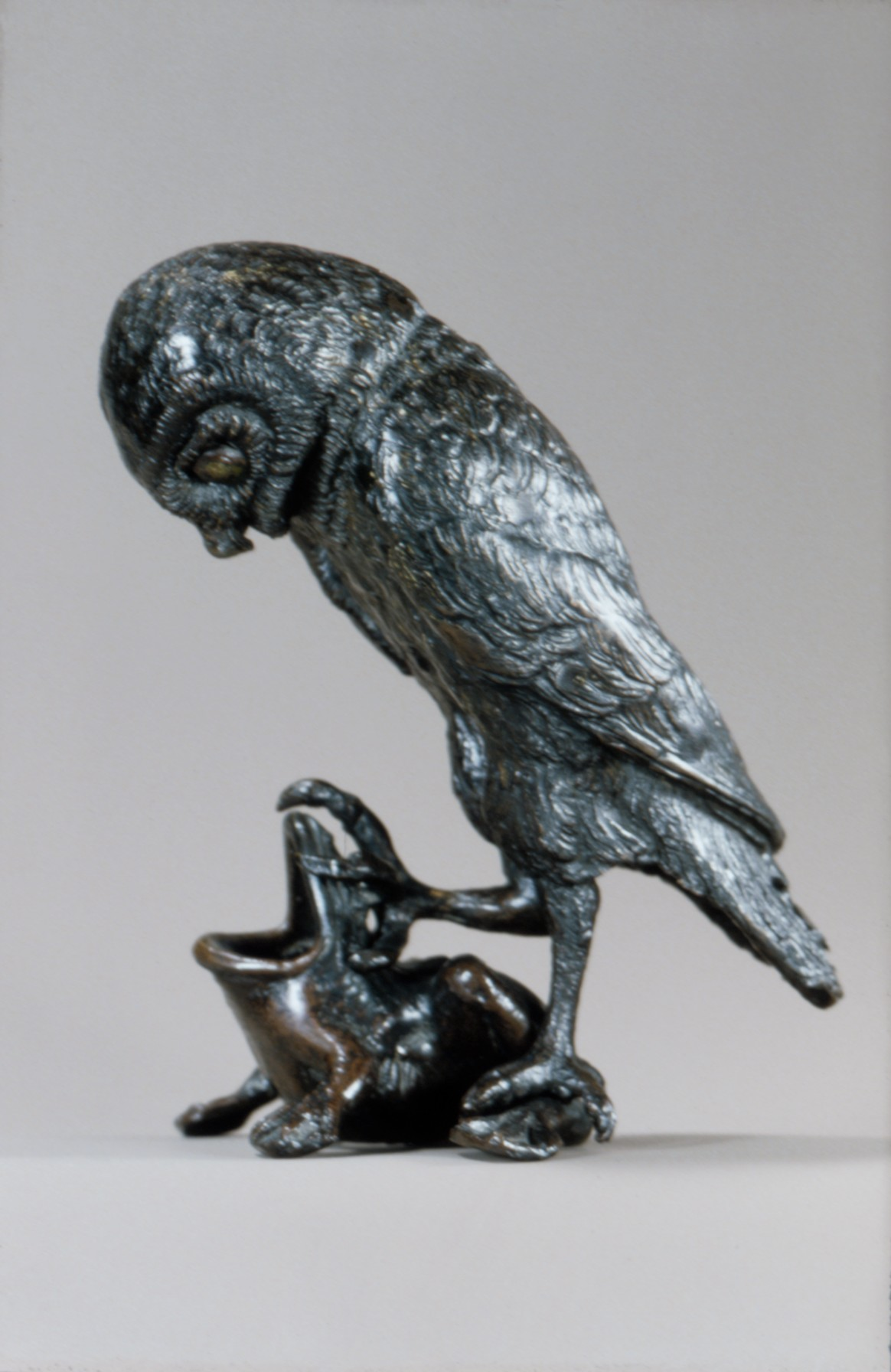
- Year: c. 1620
- Medium: Bronze, with brown lacquer patina
- Dimensions: 17.1 cm (6.7 in)
- Location: Metropolitan Museum of Art; New York City
- Accession: 1982.60.123
- Website: www.metmuseum.org/art/collection/search/207026

Owl on a Frog is an early 17th century bronze sculpture depicting an owl preying on a frog. The Austrian-produced sculpture is currently in the collection of the Metropolitan Museum of Art.

== Description ==
The sculpture shares many similarities with other sculptures in private collections and in Ambras Castle. One source attributes the sculpture to European metalsmith Caspar Gras. The frog's mouth can serve as an inkwell.
