= Imperial Armoury =

Museum collection in Vienna

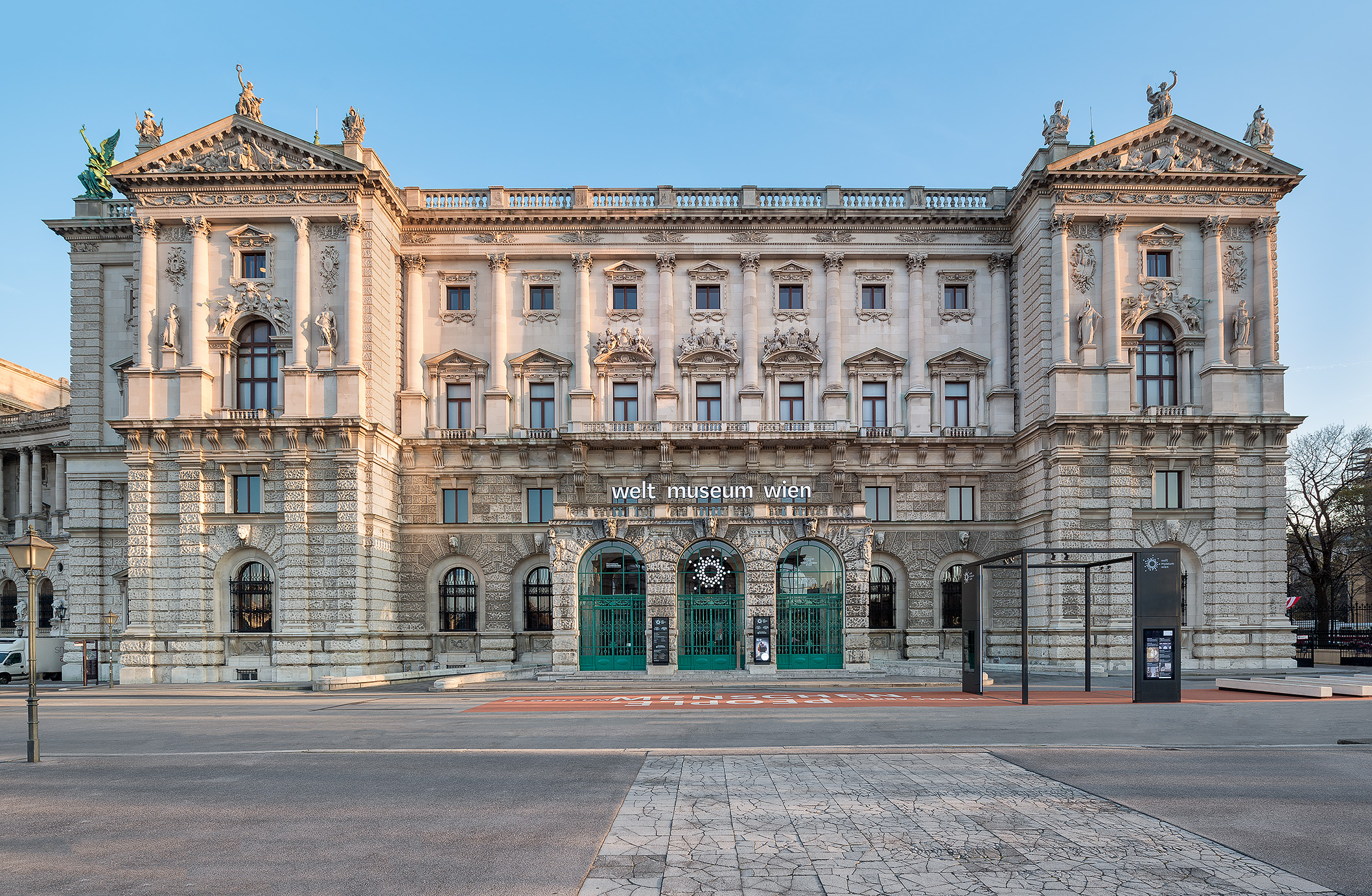
The Neue Hofburg palace at Heldenplatz with the Imperial Armoury on the first floor.

The Imperial Armoury (Hofjagd- und Rüstkammer, HJRK), formerly known as Waffensammlung, is a collection of the Kunsthistorisches Museum Vienna. Together with the armoury at Ambras Castle near Innsbruck, which is also a member of the KHM museum group (KHM-Museumsverband), it houses the arms assembled by the Austrian branch of the Habsburg dynasty. It is one of the largest and most well-documented historical collections of arms and armour in the world.

First published in 1601, the Armamentarium Heroicum—an illustrated inventory of the Ambras "Armoury of Heroes" that forms the core of the Imperial Armoury—is the oldest museum catalogue in the world. Thanks to the extensive publications of former directors such as Wendelin Boeheim and Bruno Thomas, the collection is also regarded as a cornerstone of modern scholarship on arms and armour.

== Locations ==
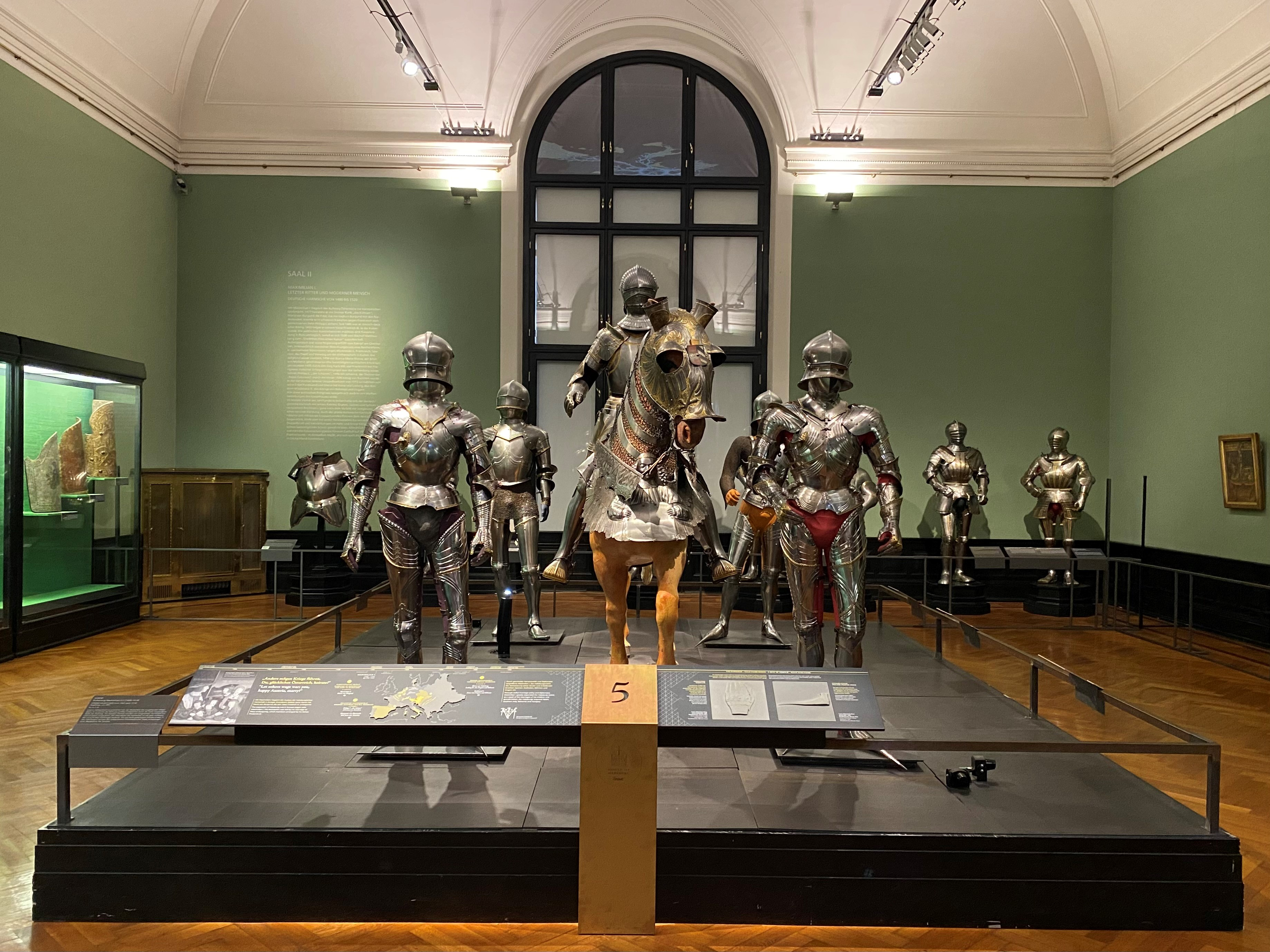
Imperial Armoury, Gallery "Emperor Maximilian I"

=== Neue Hofburg, Vienna ===
The Imperial Armoury is located on the first floor of the Neue Hofburg on Heldenplatz. The permanent exhibition consists of nine rooms and three galleries. The itinerary is organised chronologically:

- Armour in the Middle Ages
- Tournaments at the court of Emperor Maximilian I
- Emperor Maximilian I
- The ‘Heroes’ Armoury’ of Archduke Ferdinand II of Tyrol
- All'antica armour
- Court spectacles
- Europe and Western Asia
- Tournaments of the Renaissance
- Armour of the late Renaissance
- The courtly hunt from the Middle Ages to the nineteenth century

=== Ambras Castle, Innsbruck ===
Numerous objects are on permanent loan at the armoury of Ambras Castle.

== History ==
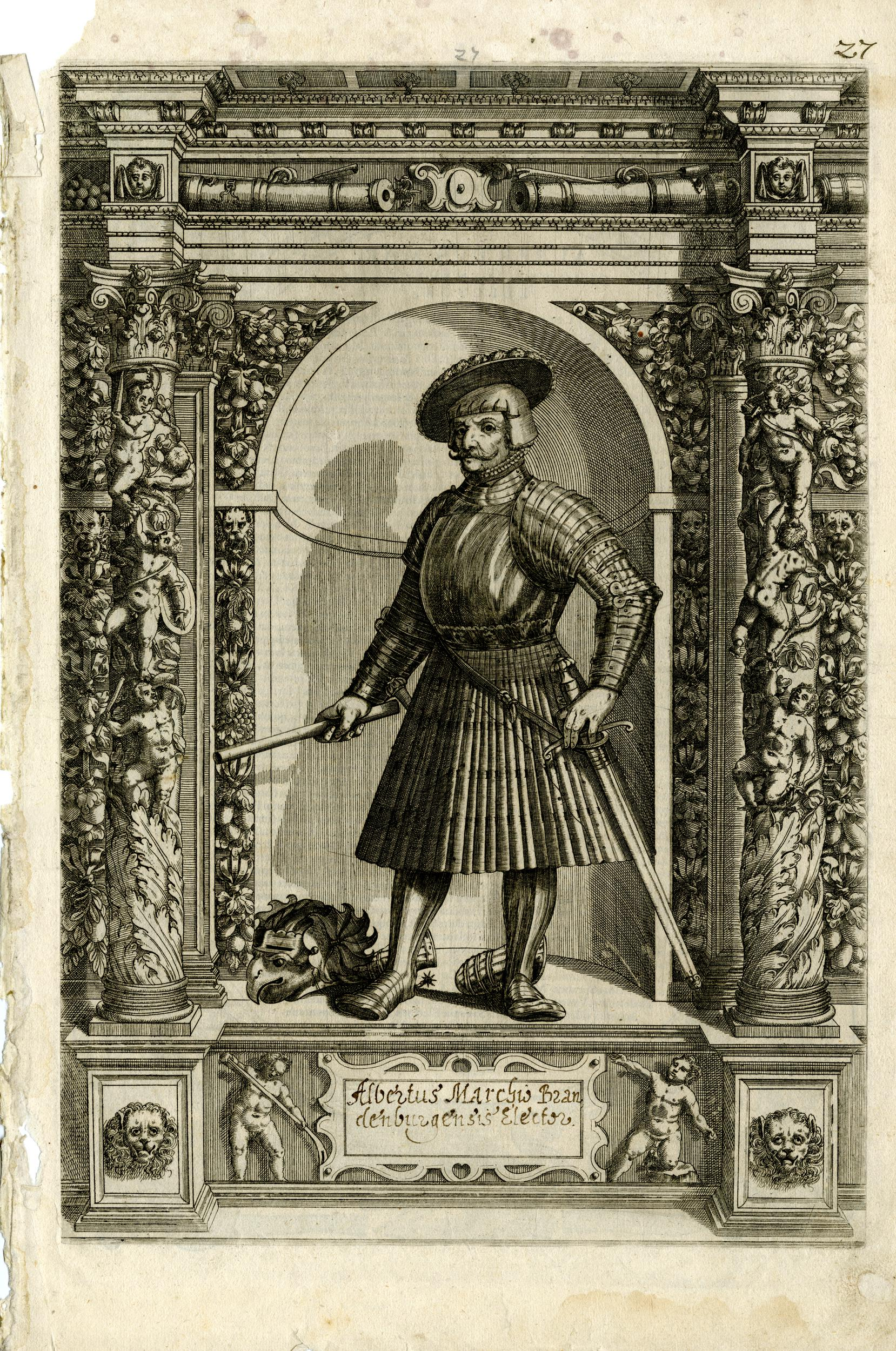
Portrait of Elector Albert "Achilles" of Brandenburg wearing armour A 78. Engraving from Jacob Schrenck von Notzing's Armamentarium Heroicum (1601).

=== Ambras Collection ===
The nucleus of the Imperial Armoury is the Ambras Collection (k.u.k. Ambraser Sammlung), which was transferred from Ambras Castle to the Lower Belvedere palace in 1806. There is evidence of a princely armoury in Tyrol as early as 1480 under Archduke Sigismund. His nephew, Emperor Maximilian I, inherited this collection and greatly expanded it. After a significant part was transferred to Spain for Emperor Charles V (now in the Real Armería, Madrid), Charles's younger brother, King Ferdinand I (later Emperor Ferdinand I), took over the Tyrolean armoury.

The most significant contributions came from Archduke Ferdinand II, who established an independent Tyrolean princely line. After 1547, as regent of Bohemia, Ferdinand II amassed an extensive collection of military, sporting, and ceremonial weapons as part of his lavish court culture. Thus, upon his appointment to Tyrol in 1565, he transported around 17-18 tons of personal arms from Prague to Innsbruck, storing them in the Hofburg. In Innsbruck, Ferdinand not only continued to commission personal pieces but also conceived a unique vision for a "Armoury of Heroes." Here, he brought together arms and armour associated with renowned European and non-European warriors of the past and present, together with their portraits and biographies, thereby claiming their legacy as his own.

Archduke Ferdinand's armoury is well documented in inventories from 1555, 1583, 1593 and 1596. The most important testimony is Jakob Schrenck von Notzing's Armamentarium Heroicum, which contains 125 engravings of the archduke's "heroes" in their respective armours alongside their printed biographies. The Latin edition of this illustrated inventory of the "Armoury of Heroes" was published in Innsbruck in 1601, the German edition following two years later. This work is considered to be the world's first museum catalogue.

In 1606, Emperor Rudolph II acquired the Ambras collection from Ferdinand II's illegitimate son, Margrave Charles of Burgau, for the enormous sum of 170,000 guilders. He intended to unite it with his Kunstkammer in Prague, but this plan was never realized. Ferdinand's successors as independent rulers of Tyrol added their personal arms to the Ambras armoury.

In 1806, ten armours and weapons associated with prominent Frenchmen were confiscated and taken to Paris by inspecteur général Jacques-Pierre Orillard de Villemanzy on behalf of Napoleon, including the field and equestrian armour of Francis I of France. That same year, Emperor Francis II had the remaining collection evacuated to Vienna after Tyrol was ceded to Bavaria. Initially stored in the Kaisergarten in Vienna's third district, the collection was later installed in the Lower Belvedere—the former summer residence of Prince Eugene of Savoy—during the Congress of Vienna in 1814. There it was opened to the public as entertainment. In 1888, it was merged with the imperial arms collection from Vienna.

Wendelin Boeheim reorganized the remaining holdings at Ambras Castle, incorporating objects from Vienna and Laxenburg. The newly arranged armoury at Ambras, featuring two galleries, was opened in 1882. In 1952, its administration was joined with the Imperial Armoury (Waffensammlung) at the Kunsthistorisches Museum.

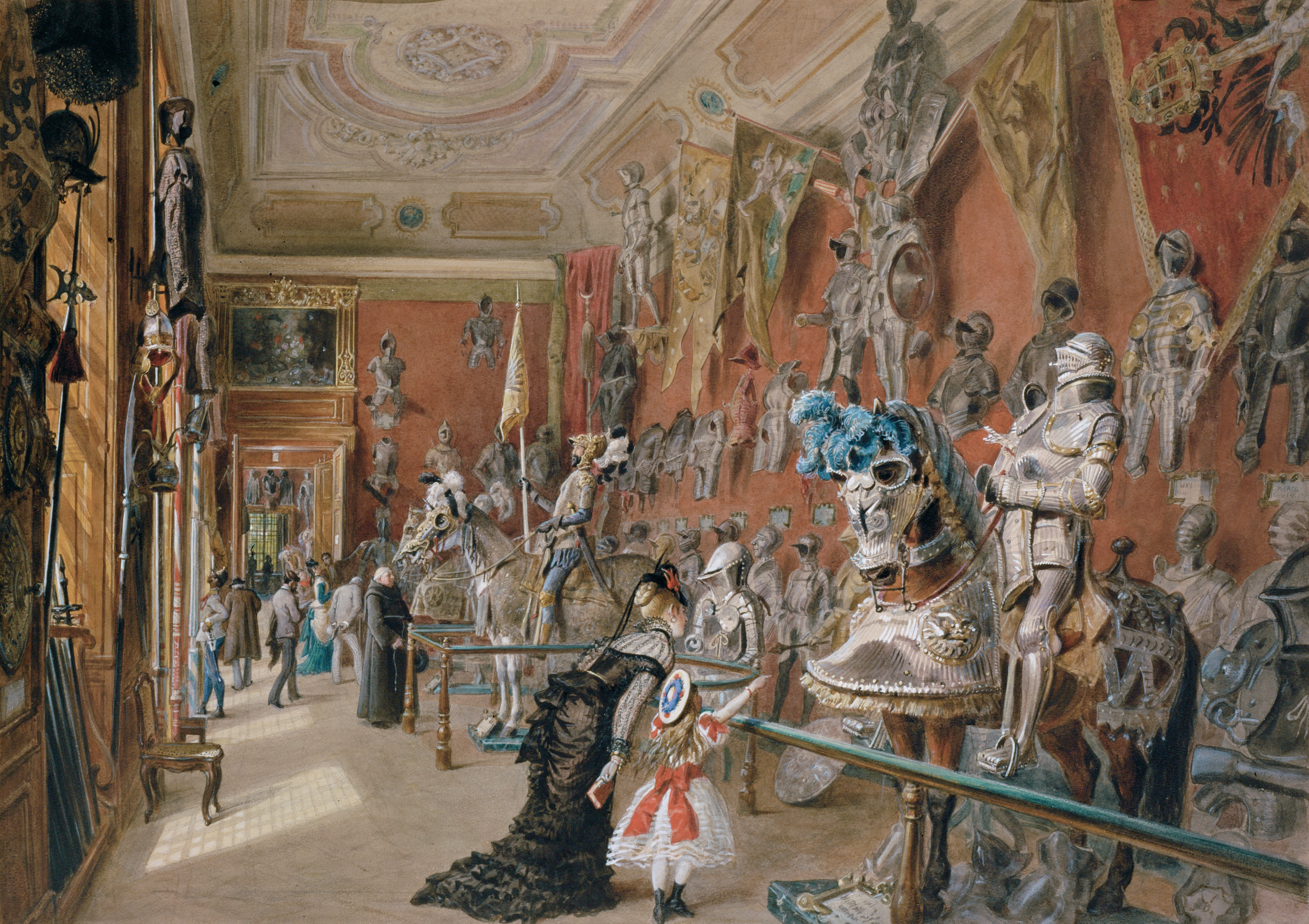
Carl Goebel the Younger, Gallery (Rüstkammer II) in the Lower Belvedere Palace, Vienna (1875)

=== Imperial Arsenal ===
In the fifteenth century, the Habsburgs‘ holdings of arms and armour in Vienna were housed in the so-called Ungarische Hof on the corner of Augustinerstraße and Dorotheergasse. Emperor Maximilian I kept his personal arms in the medieval castle. In addition, a royal armoury was housed in the "Öden Kirchen" of St. Paul near St. Michael's Church. In 1598, this was moved to the top floor of the Stallburg, which was built for Maximilian II after 1558.

In 1750, this collection was moved from the Stallburg to the imperial arsenal in Renngasse (Kaiserliches Zeughaus). Emperor Ferdinand I had acquired the Salzburger Hof there in 1559 and it was converted into an armoury by Emperor Rudolph II between 1584 and 1587. In 1672, under Emperor Leopold I, Raimund Montecuccoli extended the building to a surface of over 8500 m^{2}, including a courtyard of over 6000 m^{2}. Between 1759 and 1771, under Empress Maria Theresa, Nikolaus Unterriedmüller created a museum on the site, which was a combination of an Habsburg hall of fame and an armoury for practical use. The conceptual centre was a museum of the Seven Years' War (1756-1763) between Austria and Prussia. In 1765, with Joseph II‘s accession, the arms and armour of the Styrian-Hungarian line of the Habsburgs, which had been independent between 1546 and 1619, were transferred from Graz to the imperial arsenal in Vienna.

After the Battle of Austerlitz in 1805, the French confiscated precious pieces of artillery and armour, which were transferred to the Musée de l'Armée in Paris. The resulting gaps were filled during the Congress of Vienna in 1814 and an important illustrated inventory was subsequently created by Paul Löbhardt and Mathias Waniek in 1817/19. Friedrich Otto von Leber's published inventory of 1846 is the first scholarly catalogue of the imperial arsenal. Applying art-historical methods to the objects, he arrived at new and largely correct dates. Shortly after, the arsenal suffered considerable losses through looting in the revolutionary year of 1848.

=== K.K. Hofwaffensammlung ===
The imperial arsenal was cleared out in 1856, just before Emperor Francis Joseph decreed the enlargement of Vienna on 20 December 1857. The building was demolished. After considerable sales of obsolete mass-produced military goods, its contents were joined with the Ambras Collection from the Lower Belvedere at the newly built Imperial Arsenal on the outskirts of the city. Theophil von Hansen’s plans for a display organized along decorative criteria was rejected by the emperor in 1863. Instead, the ‘Imperial and Royal Court Arms Collection’ was displayed according to scholarly criteria. It was curated by Quirin von Leitner and was presented in the halls on either side of the Hall of Fame on the main floor.

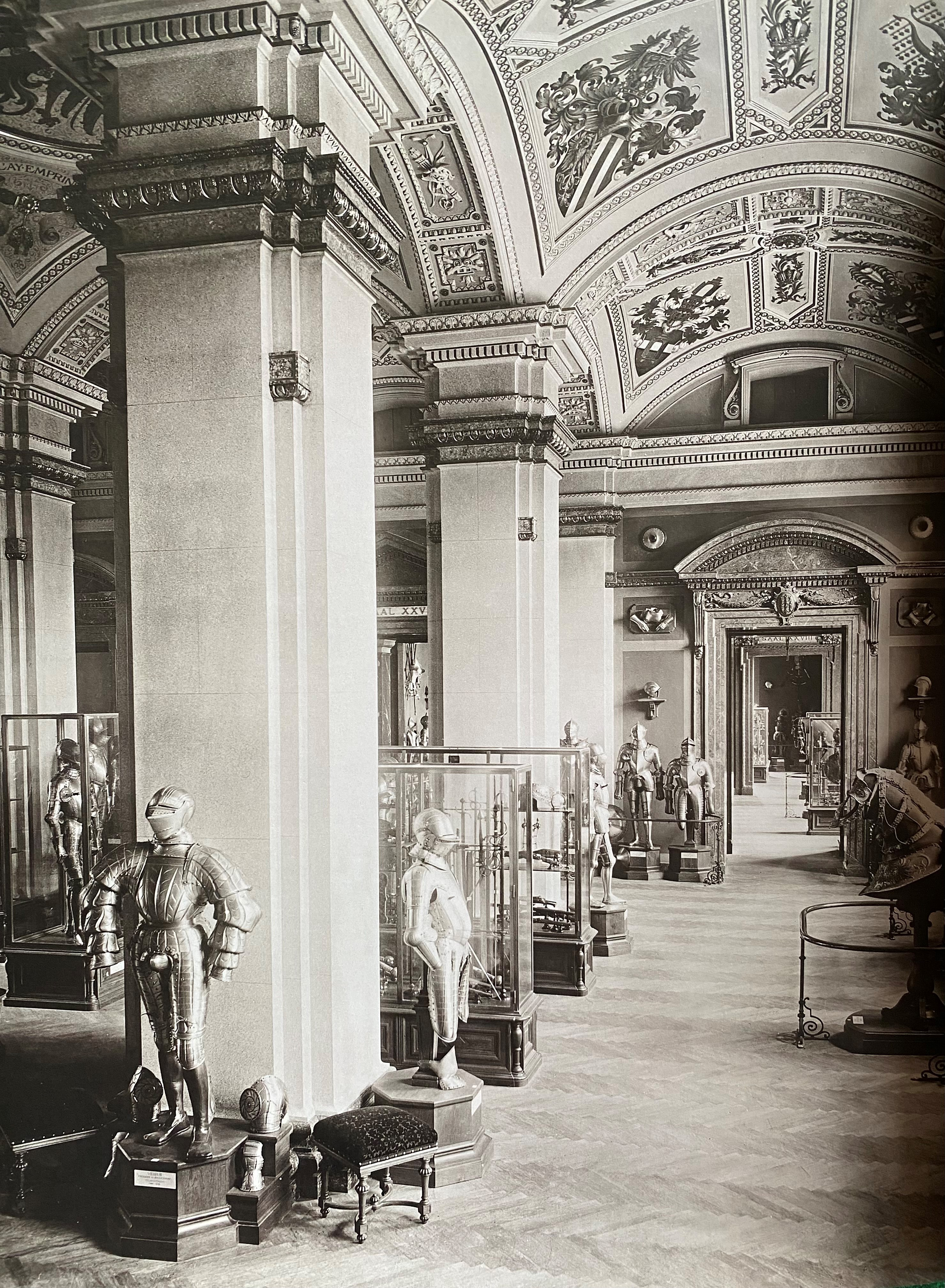
The Waffensammlung in former Gallery XXVII of the new museum building on Burgring, c.1910.

=== Kunsthistorische Sammlungen des Allerhöchsten Kaiserhauses ===
In 1888, the Hofwaffensammlung was transferred to the new building of the Kunsthistorisches Museum on Burgring in connection with the founding of the Kunsthistorische Sammlungen des Allerhöchsten Kaiserhauses. In 1885, the k. u. k. Heeresmuseum was simultaneously founded at the Imperial Arsenal. Known as Museum of Military History today, this museum still presents the recent history of the Austrian military from the sixteenth century onwards.

The Arms Collection (Waffensammlung) was opened to the public on the mezzanine in 1889. Curated by Wendelin Boeheim, the collection centered on older holdings from the period up to the Thirty Years' War, especially the personal arms of the Habsburg family. The new Waffensammlung also included large parts of the collections of the court hunting or rifle chamber, the court saddle chamber and parts of the collection of weapons that Emperor Francis II had established around 1800 in the neo-Gothic Franzensburg castle at Laxenburg to the south of Vienna.

In 1918, the "Art Historical Collections of the Most High Imperial House" became the property of the Republic of Austria.

In 1922, the imperial carriage collection, tack room (Monturdepot), and the significant remainder of the fire arms collection, which had remained in the imperial stables in 1889, were added to the Waffensammlung. The carriage collection and tack room only became independent collections of the Kunsthistorisches Museum in 1947.

=== Neue Hofburg ===
After numerous sales of "duplicates" in 1925/26, almost 100 objects were ceded to the Hungarian National Museum, Budapest, as a result of the peace settlement with Hungary after World War I (for instance, the boy's armour of Sigismund II Augustus of Poland). In 1934, the Waffensammlung was moved from the Kunsthistorisches Museum on Burgring to the first floor of the Ringstrasse wing of the Neue Hofburg.

As part of the establishment of a "Central Depot for Confiscated Collections" in the Neue Hofburg in 1938, looted works of art from Jewish ownership were also housed in what was then Gallery IX of the Arms Collection (today: Sammlung Alte Musikinstrumente). For example, in the year of the so-called Anschluss, the Gestapo confiscated the important Jewish art collections of Alphonse and Clarice Rothschild and Louis Rothschild, from which over 30 valuable weapons and pieces of armour were allocated to the Arms Collection.

In 1946, further reorganization work began. The Leibrüstkammer (500 CE to the death of Emperor Matthias, 1619) and the Hofjagdkammer (1619-1916, from Emperor Ferdinand II to Francis Joseph) were only opened in 1967. In 1990, the Waffensammlung was renamed Hofjagd- und Rüstkammer.

On 11 February 1999, the Austrian Art Restitution Advisory Board recommended the return of the objects from the Viennese Rothschild Collections. The restitution took place on 11 March 1999.

== Exhibitions ==
In 1940, a special exhibition of "repatriated" arms and armours from occupied Paris was held in the newly occupied rooms of the Neue Hofburg. Numerous objects were shown that had been taken from Ambras Castle and the Vienna Armoury to France in the course of the Napoleonic confiscations. As a counterpart to this exhibition, the Wehrmacht organised the propaganda exhibition "Victorious German Arms" on Heldenplatz.

In 1990/91, the Imperial Armoury organized the exhibition "Robes and Armour - Fashion in steel and silk, past and present," in which objects from the collection were juxtaposed with creations by the Italian fashion designer Roberto Cappucci.

In 2022, the exhibition "Iron Men - Fashion in Steel" was shown, in which armour and weapons were presented in the light of historical rituals, symbols and gender roles.

== Directors ==
- 1878–1900: Wendelin Boeheim
- 1918–1922: Camillo List
- 1923–1938: August Grosz
- 1938–1945: Leopold Ruprecht
- 1946–1975: Bruno Thomas
- 1976–1986: Ortwin Gamber
- 1986–2013: Christian Beaufort-Spontin
- 2013–2020: Matthias Pfaffenbichler
- 2020–2024: Stefan Krause

== Important objects ==
- Great helm of Albert von Prankh, Northern Italy/Southern Germany/Austrian, c.1330-1340, Acc. No. B 74
- Bone saddle, South German, mid-15th century, Acc. No. A 64
- Helmet of George Castriota “Skanderbeg“, Italy, second half of the fifteenth century, Acc. No. A 127
- Lorenz Helmschmid, Field armour of Emperor Maximilian I, Augsburg, c.1485, Acc. No. A 62
- Hans Rabeiler, Unfinished boy's armour of Philip “the Handsome“, Innsbruck, 1511-1512, Acc. No. A 186
- Conrad Seusenhofer, Boy's armour of Charles V, Innsbruck, 1512-1514, Acc. No. A 109
- Costume armour with a steel skirt, German, 1520s, Acc. No. A 78
- Coloman Helmschmid, Landsknecht costume armour of Wilhelm von Rogendorf, Augsburg, 1523, Acc. No. A 374
- Filippo Negroli, All’antica burgonet of Francesco Maria I della Rovere, Milan, 1532, Acc. No. A 498a
- Negroli workshop (attr.), Medusa shield, Milan, c.1550-1555, Acc. No. 693a
- Pere Juan Poch (attr.) and Antonio Piccinino, Gold rapier of Emperor Maximilian II, Barcelona (?) and Milan, mid-16th century, Acc. No. A 588
- Kunz Lochner, Half-armour of Nicolas IV Radziwill, Nuremberg, c.1555, Acc. No. A 1412
- Jörg Seusenhofer and Hans Perckhammer, Eagle garniture of Archduke Ferdinand II of Tyrol, Innsbruck, 1547, Acc. No. 638
- Coral sabre, German, c.1560, Acc. No. A 791
- Lucio Piccinino, Armour garniture of Duke Alessandro Farnese, Milan, 1576-1580, Acc. No. A 1132
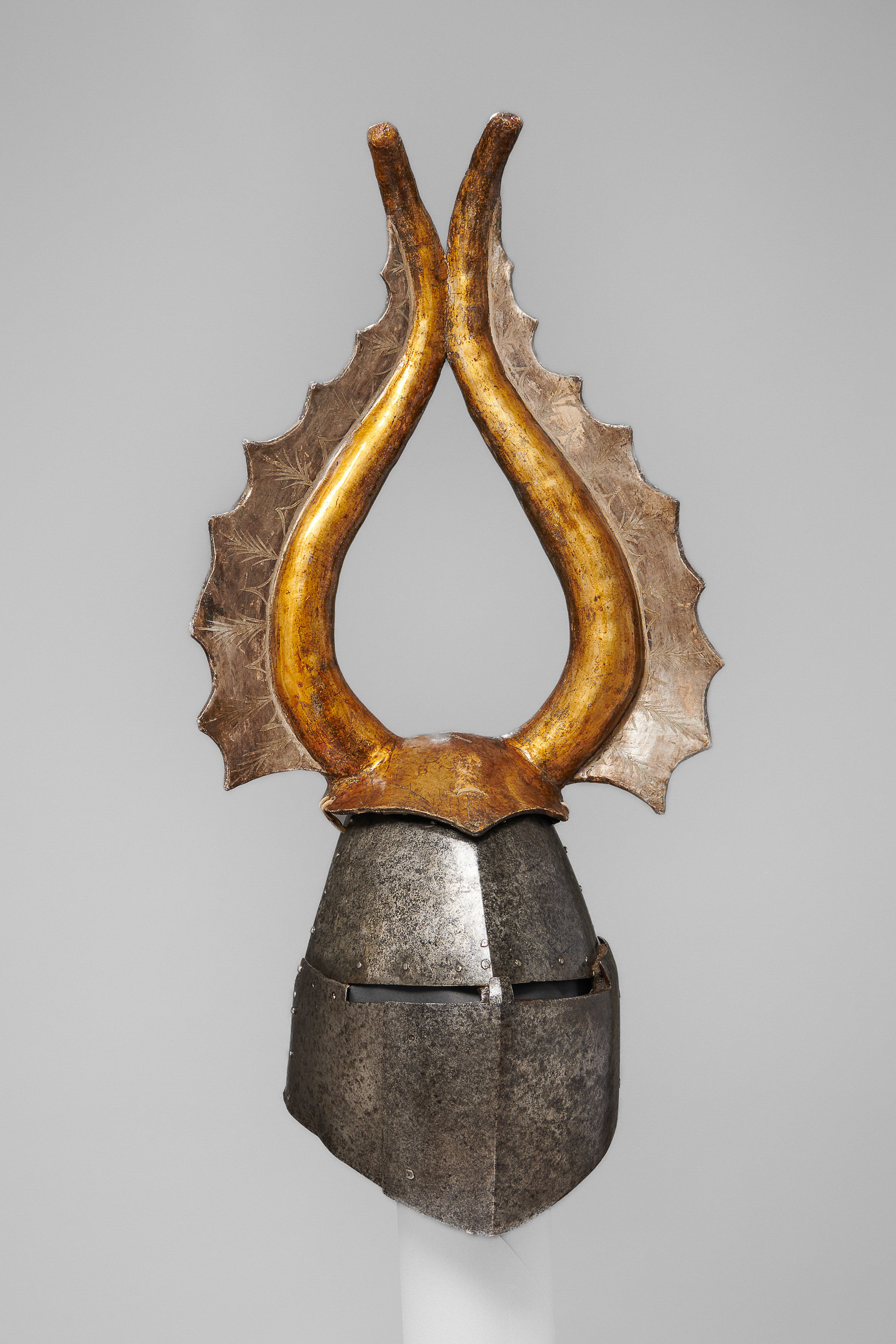
Great helm of Albert von Prankh

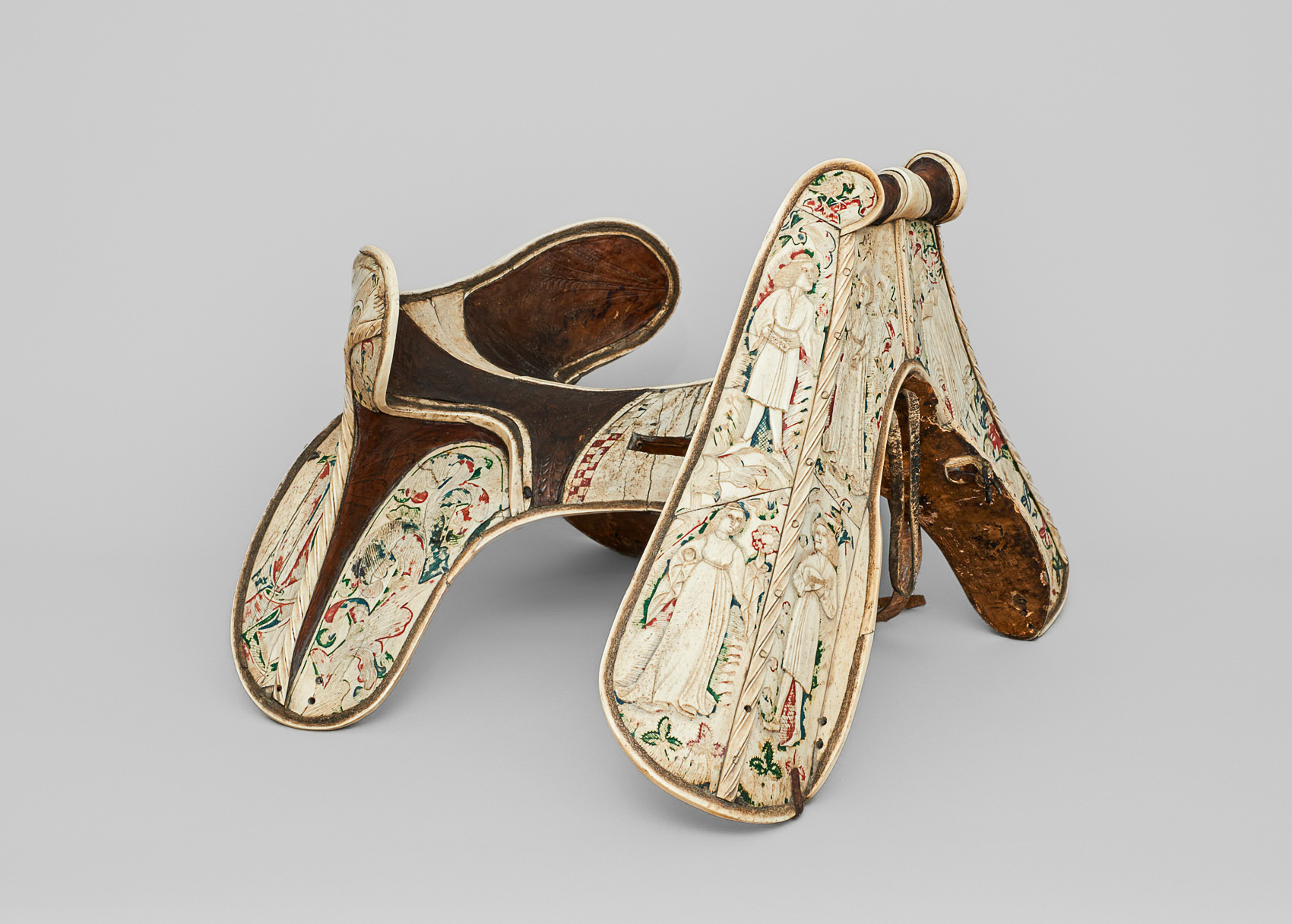
Bone saddle

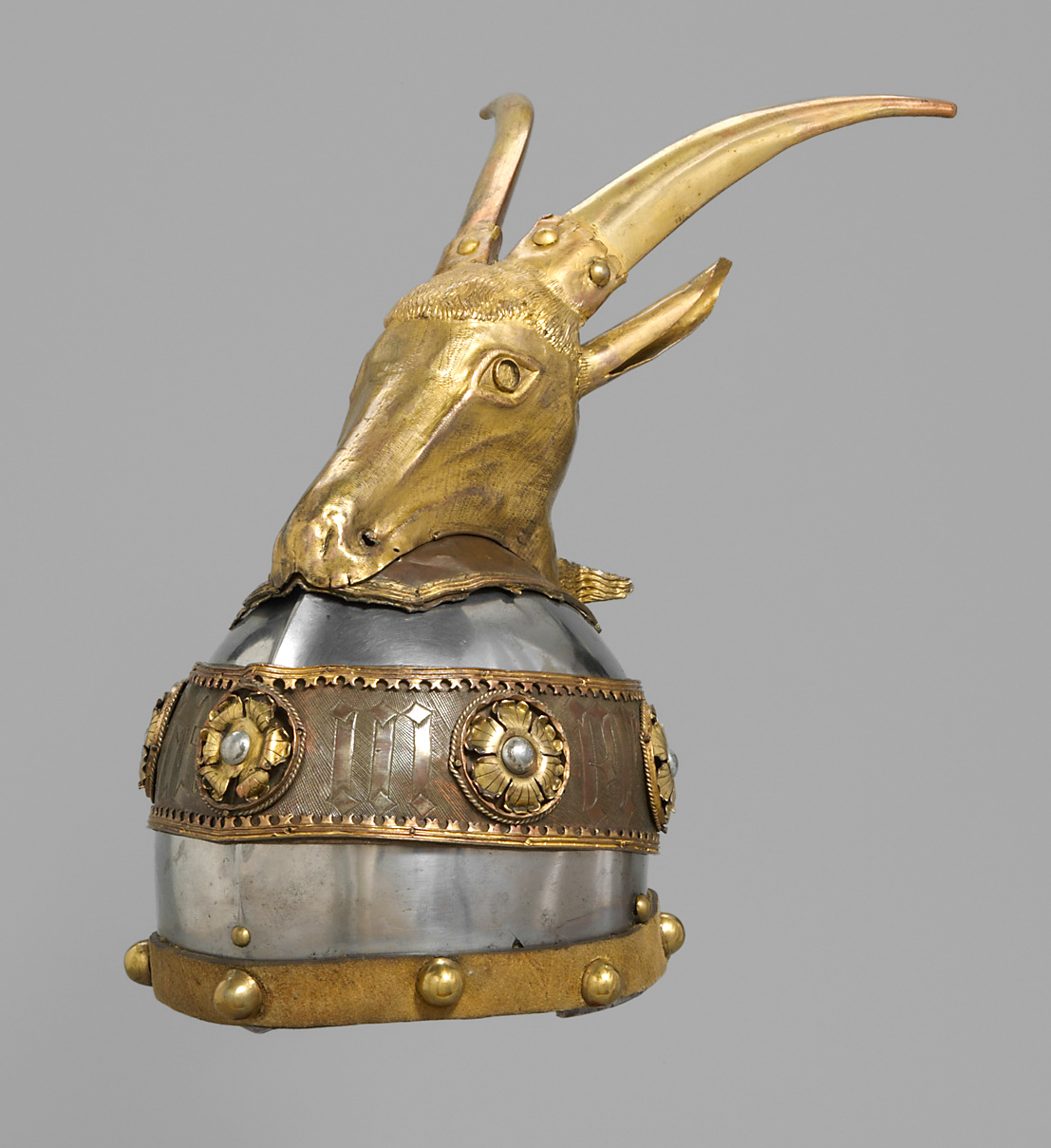
Helmet of Skanderbeg

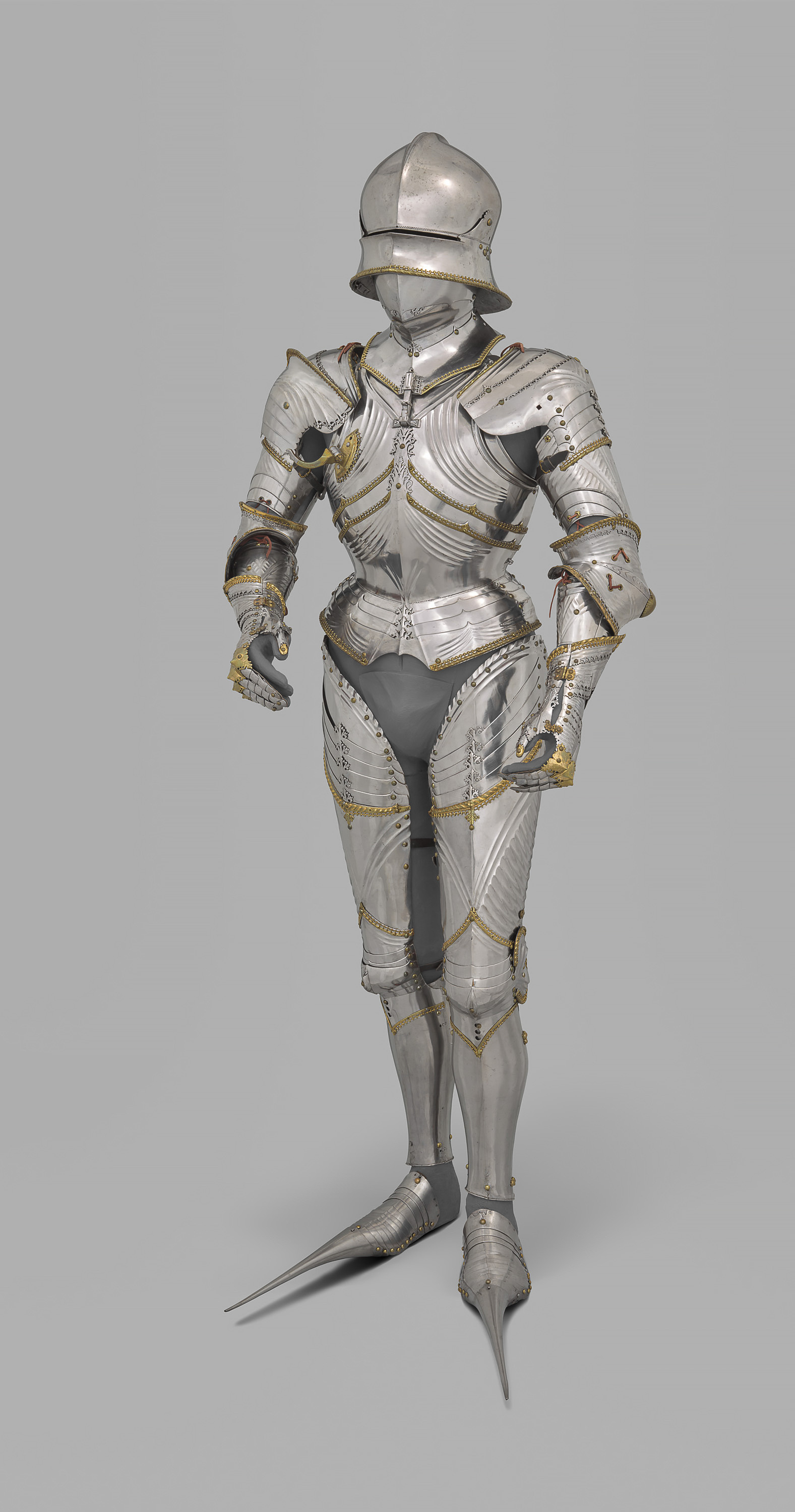
Field armour of Maximilian I

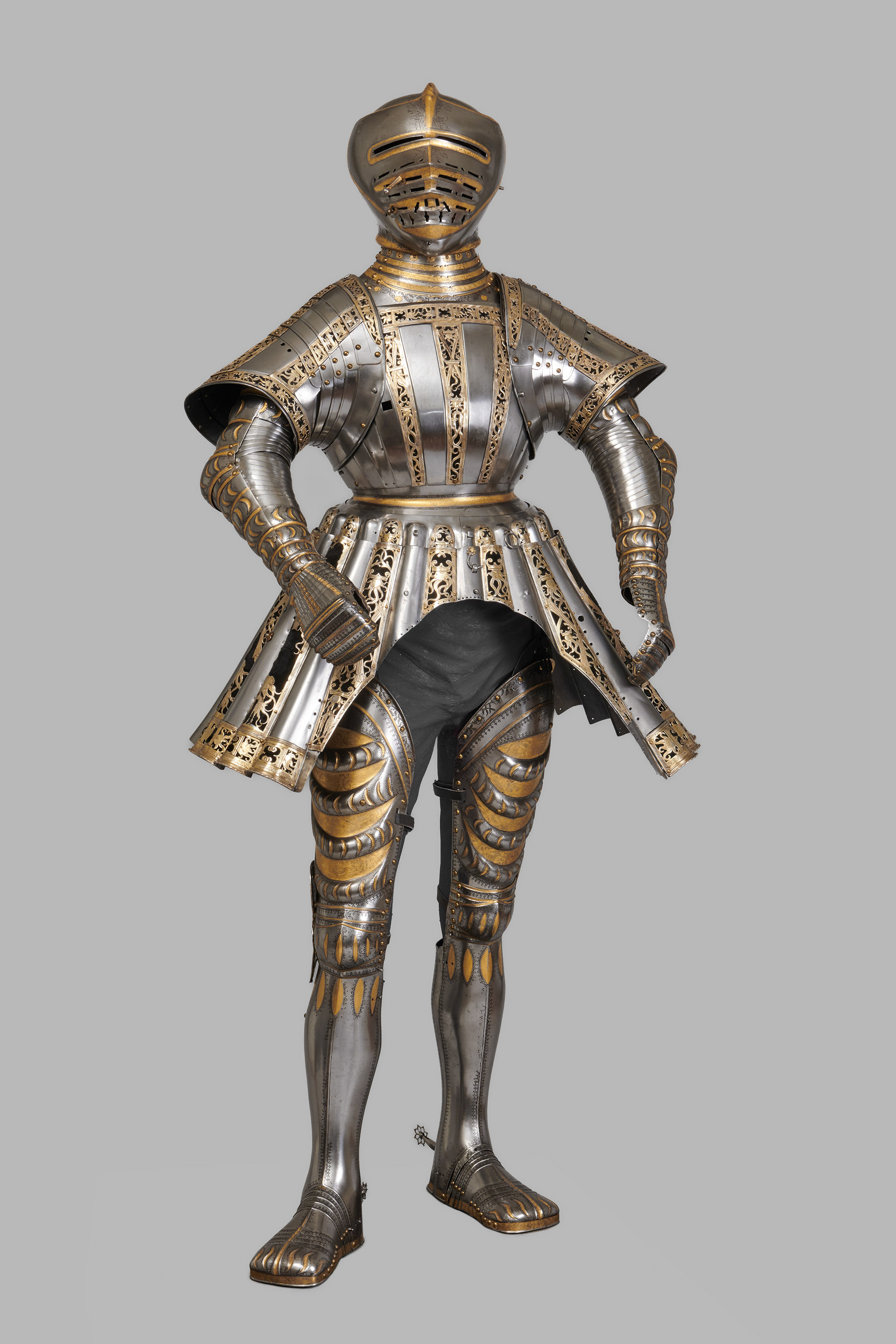
Boy's armour of Emperor Charles V

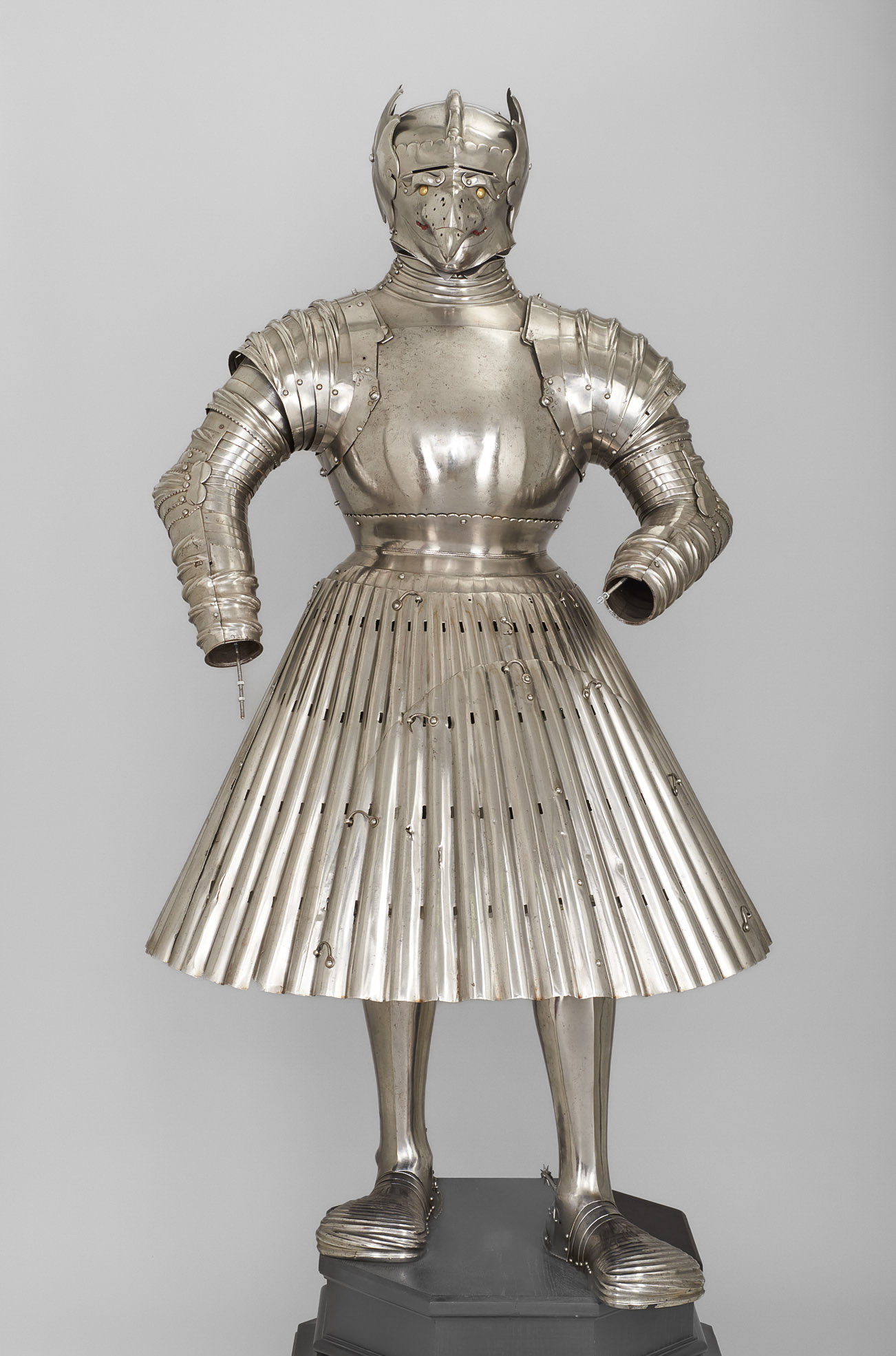
Costume armour with steel skirt

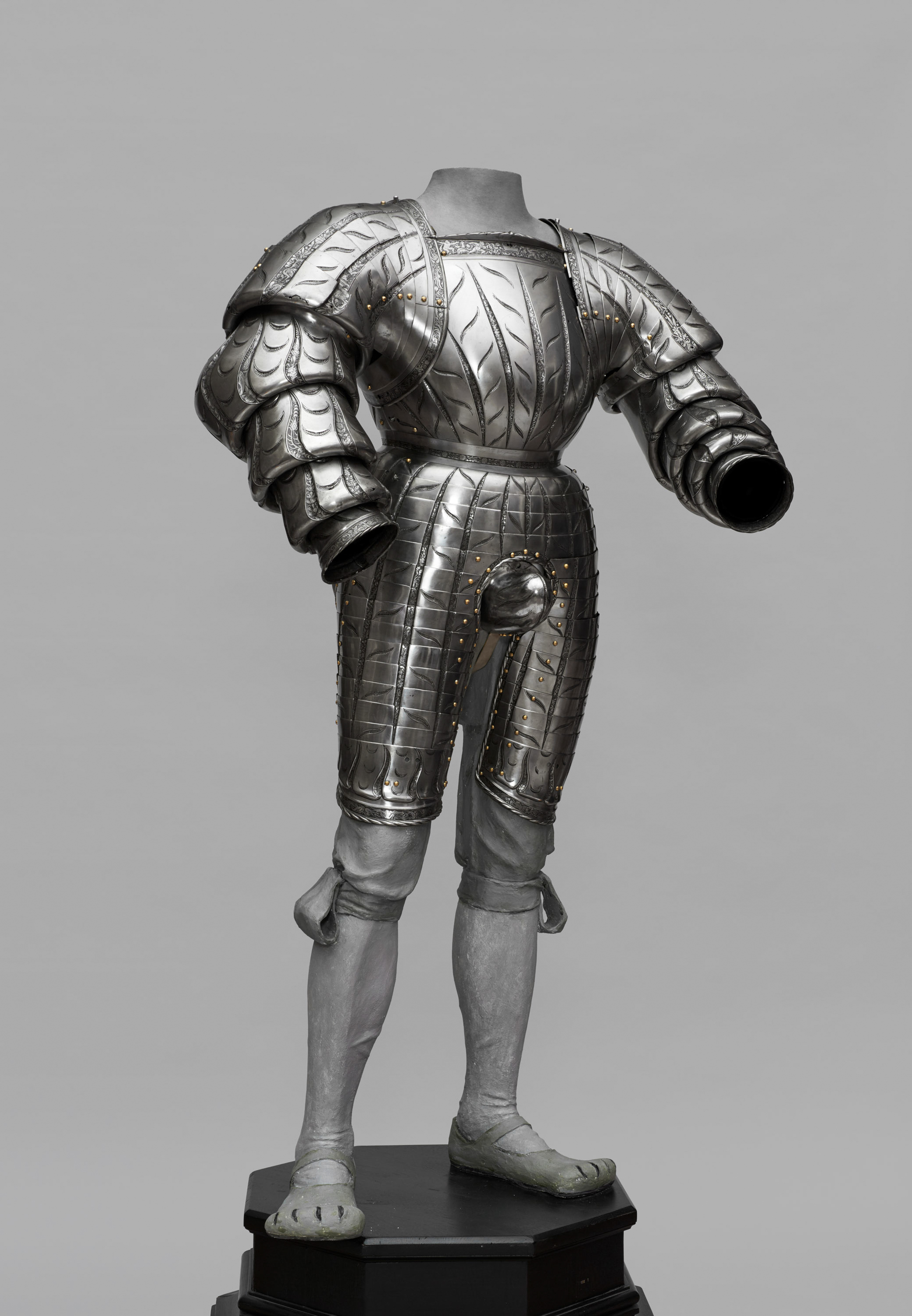
Landsknecht armour of Wilhelm von Rogendorf

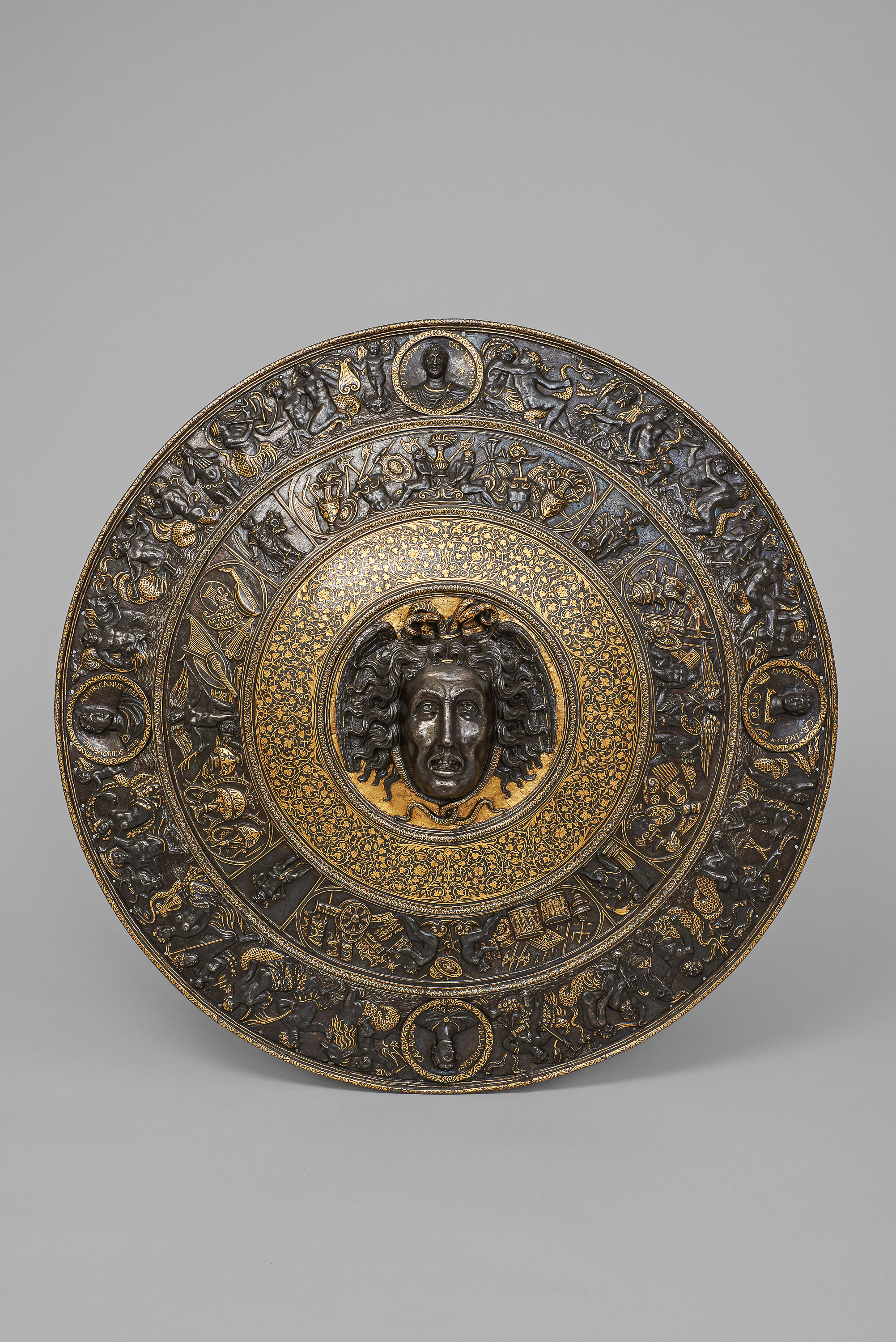
Medusa shield

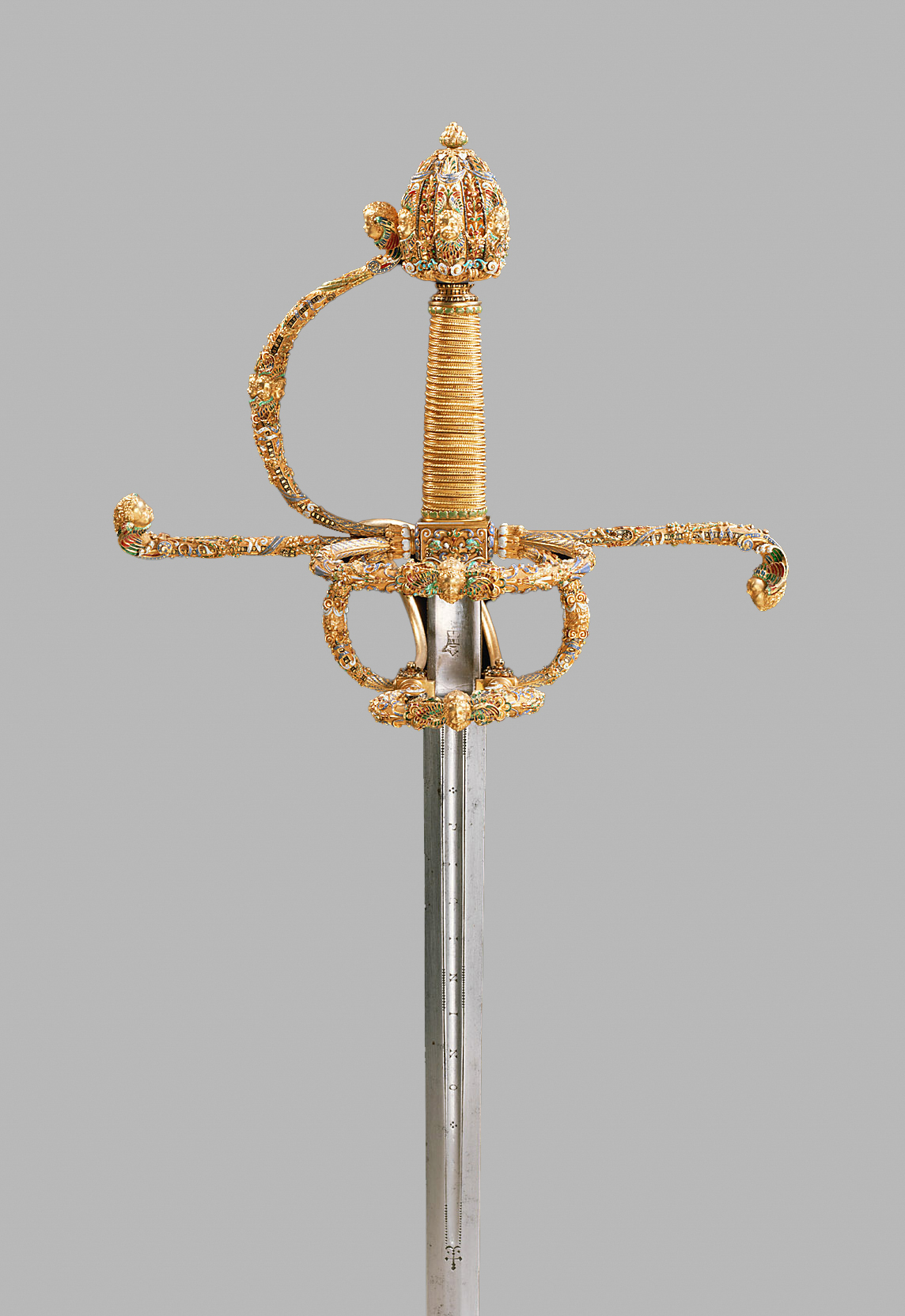
Gold rapier

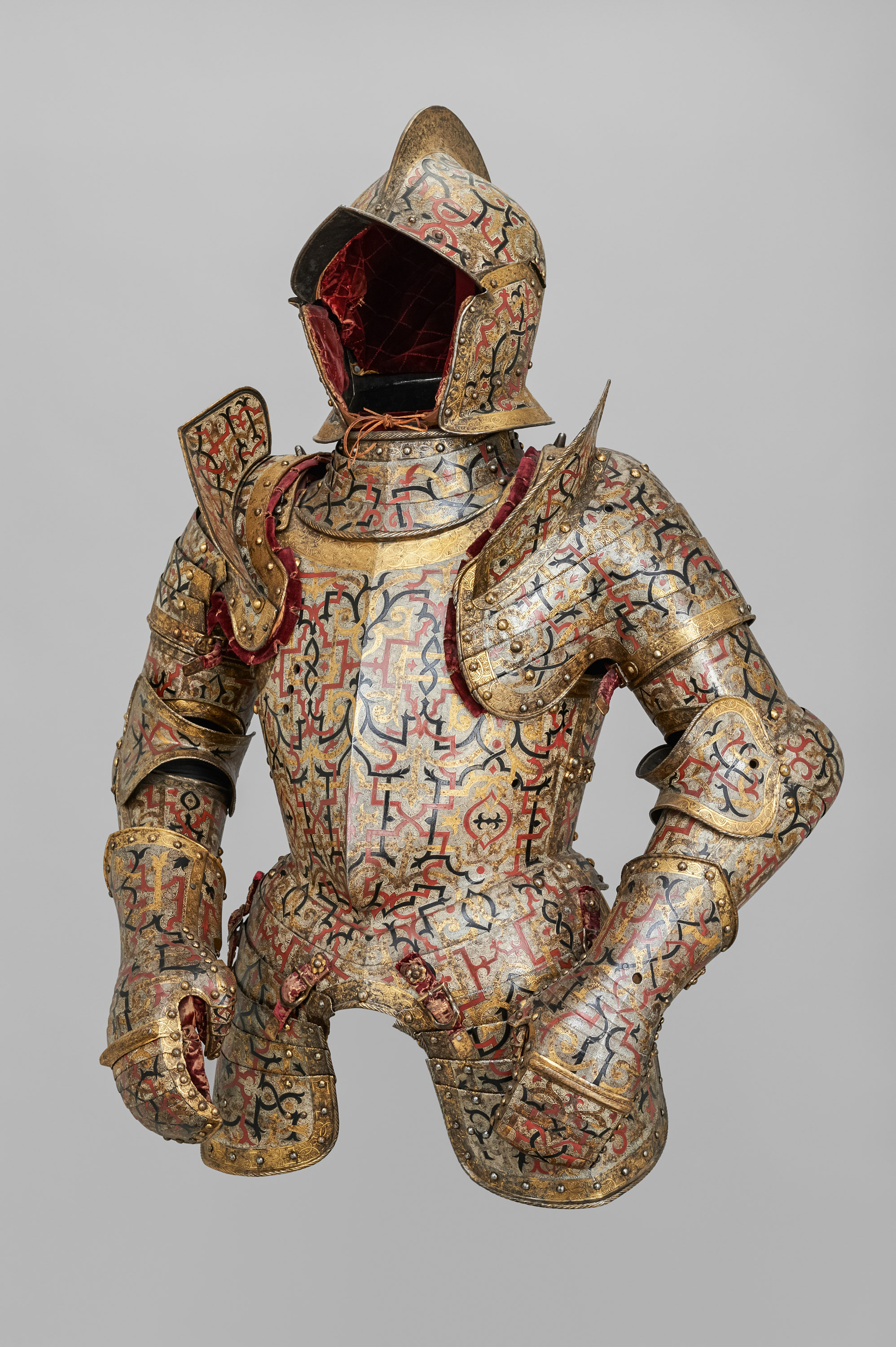
Half-armour of Nicolas Radziwill

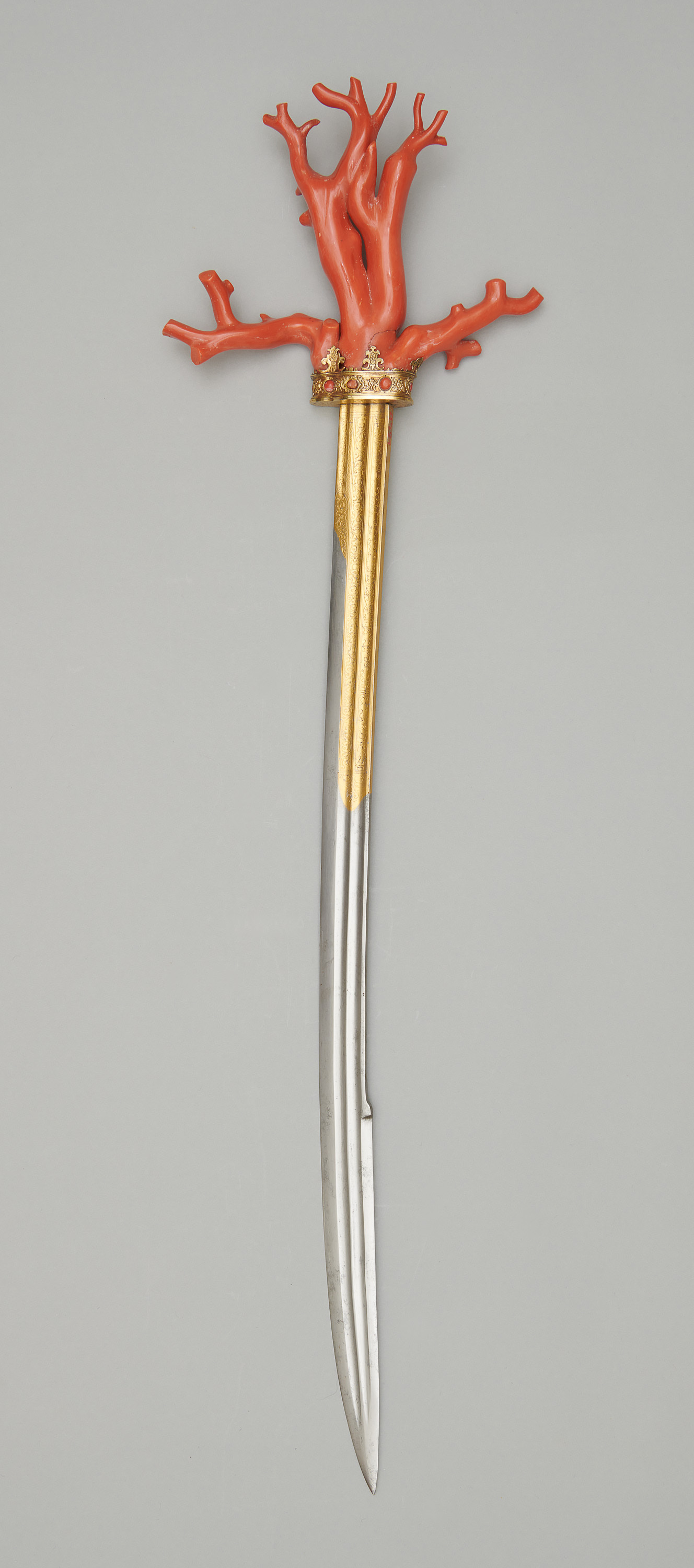
Coral sabre

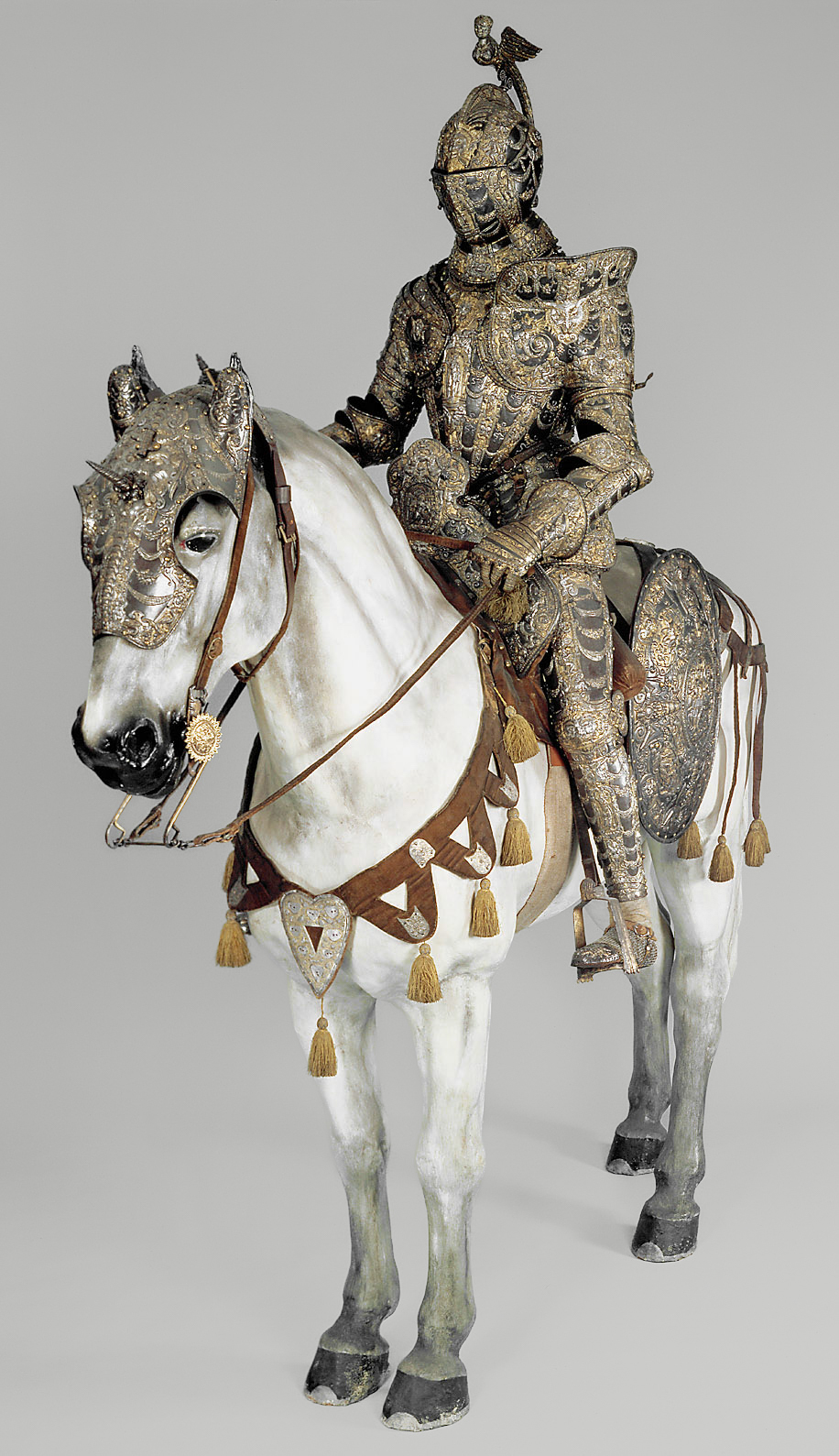
Farnese garniture

== Literature ==
- Quirin von Leitner: Die Waffensammlung des österreichischen Kaiserhauses im K. K. Artillerie-Arsenal-Museum in Wien, 2 vols. (Vienna, 1866–70).
- Wendelin Boeheim: Die aus dem Kaiserlichen Schlosse Ambras stammenden Rüstungen und Waffen im Musée d’Artillerie zu Paris. In: Jahrbuch der Kunsthistorischen Sammlungen des Allerhöchsten Kaiserhauses, vol. 19, 1898, pp. 217–239 (digital copy)
- Wendelin Boeheim: Führer durch die Waffensammlung, Kunsthistorische Sammlungen des Allerhöchsten Kaiserhauses (Vienna, 1889) (digital copy)
- August Grosz, Bruno Thomas: Katalog der Waffensammlung in der neuen Burg. Schausammlung (= Führer durch die Kunsthistorischen Sammlung in Wien. Heft 28). Kunsthistorisches Museum (Vienna, 1936).
- Bruno Thomas: Die Neuaufstellung der Waffensammlung in der Neuen Burg zu Wien. In: Museumskunde. NF 9, 1937, pp. 144–164 = In: Ibid., Gesammelte Schriften zur Historischen Waffenkunde, vol. 1, Akademische Druck- und Verlagsanstalt (Graz, 1977), pp. 239–263.
- Alphons Lhotsky: Festschrift des Kunsthistorischen Museums in Wien, 1891–1941, Teil 2, 1. and 2. Hälfte: Die Geschichte der Sammlungen. (Vienna: Ferdinand Berger 1941–1945).
- Bruno Thomas: Die Beraubung der Wiener und Ambraser Rüstkammer durch die Franzosen 1805 und 1806. In: Liste der 1940 aus Frankreich zurückgeführten militärischen Gegenstände (Berlin, 1941), pp. 189–194 = In: Ibid., Gesammelte Schriften zur Historischen Waffenkunde, vol. 1 (Graz: Akademische Druck- und Verlagsanstalt, 1977), pp. 123–130.
- Bruno Thomas: Die Wiener Kaiserlichen Rüstkammern. In: Revue internationale d’histoire militaire, no. 21, 1960, pp. 12–27.
- Alice Strobl: Das k. k. Waffenmuseum im Arsenal. Der Bau und seine künstlerische Ausschmückung (= Schriften des Heeresgeschichtlichen Museums in Wien. Bd. 1) (Graz and Cologne: Böhlau, 1961).
- Bruno Thomas: Das Wiener Kaiserliche Zeughaus in der Renngasse. In: Mitteilungen des Instituts für österreichische Geschichtsforschung, vol. 71 (1963), pp. 175–193.
- Bruno Thomas, Ortwin Gamber: Katalog der Leibrüstkammer, I. Teil: Der Zeitraum von 500 bis 1530 (Vienna: Verlag Anton Schroll & Co., 1976).
- Herbert Haupt: Die Geschichte des Hauses am Ring. Hundert Jahre im Spiegel historischer Ereignisse (Vienna: Christian Brandstätter Verlag, 1991).
- Cäcilia Bischoff: Das Kunsthistorische Museum. Baugeschichte, Architektur, Dekoration. (Vienna: Christian Brandstätter Verlag, 2008).
- Stefan Krause, Mario Döberl: Ein Inventar der Wiener kaiserlichen Rüstkammer von 1678. In: Jahrbuch des Kunsthistorischen Museums Wien, vol. 19/20 (2017/2018), pp. 147–228.
