= Wendelin Boeheim =

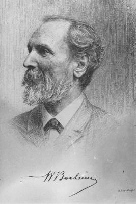
Portrait of Wendelin Boeheim (ca. 1890)

Wendelin Boeheim (also Böheim, 1832–1900) was an Austrian army officer and weapons historian.

From 1859 to 1865 he was instructor at the Theresian Military Academy. In 1866, he participated in the Bohemian campaign of the Austro-Prussian War in the rank of captain in the imperial infantry regiment Nr. 4 (Hoch- und Deutschmeister). He retired from military service in 1877 for health reasons.

From 1878, he was curator at the imperial weapons collection, in which function he was involved in the establishment of the Kunsthistorisches Museum and Militärhistorisches Museum in Vienna.

In 1897, he founded Zeitschrift für historische Waffenkunde, a journal dedicated to the study of historical weapons (now Waffen- und Kostümkunde).

His magnum opus is the Handbuch der Waffenkunde, published in 1890, which became a standard work of reference for the arms and armour of the medieval period.

== Bibliography ==
- Handbuch der Waffenkunde. Das Waffenwesen in seiner historischen Entwickelung vom Beginn des Mittelalters bis zum Ende des 18. Jahrhunderts (= Seemanns kunstgewerbliche Handbücher. Bd. 7, ZDB-ID 53757-3). Seemann, Leipzig 1890. (numerous reprints)
- Die Zeugbücher des Kaisers Maximilian I. In: Jahrbuch der Kunsthistorischen Sammlungen des Allerhöchsten Kaiserhauses. 13. Bd., 1892, ISSN 0258-5596, 94–201, online.
- Meister der Waffenschmiedekunst vom XIV. bis ins XVIII. Jahrhundert. Ein Beitrag zur Geschichte der Kunst und des Kunsthandwerks. Moser, Berlin 1897.
