= Ambras Castle =

Castle in Innsbruck, Austria

- Schloss Ambras
- Innsbruck, Austria
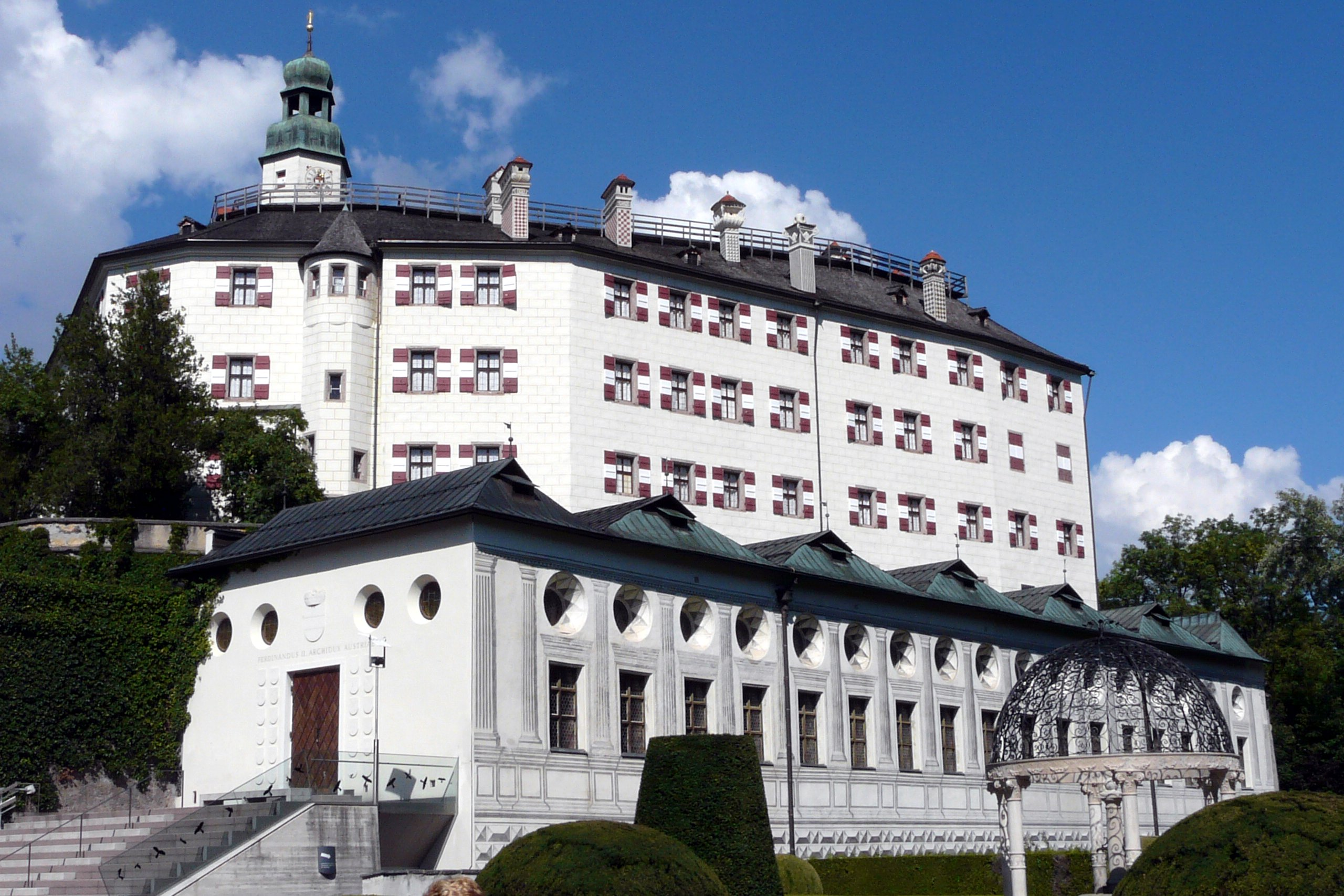
- Ambras Castle in Innsbruck, Austria

Site information
- Type: Castle

Location
- Location within Austria
- Coordinates: 47°15′24″N 11°26′05″E

Site history
- Built: 1563

Ambras Castle (German: Schloss Ambras) is a Renaissance castle and palace located in the hills above Innsbruck, Austria. Ambras Castle is 632 metres (2,073 ft) above sea level. Considered one of the most popular tourist attractions of Tyrol, Ambras Castle was built in the 16th century on the spot of an earlier 10th-century castle, which became the seat of power for the Counts of Andechs. The cultural and historical importance of the castle is closely connected with Archduke Ferdinand II (1529–1595) and served as his family's residence from 1567 to 1595. Ferdinand was one of history's most prominent collectors of art. The princely sovereign of Tyrol, son of Emperor Ferdinand I, ordered that the medieval fortress at Ambras be turned into a Renaissance castle as a gift for his wife Philippine Welser. The cultured humanist from the House of Habsburg accommodated his world-famous collections in a museum: the collections, still in the Lower Castle built specifically for that museum's purpose, make Ambras Castle one of the oldest museums in the world.

The Lower Castle contains armouries that feature masterpieces of the European armourers' art from the time of Emperor Maximilian I to Emperor Leopold I. As the only Renaissance Kunstkammer of its kind to have been preserved at its original location, the Chamber of Art and Curiosities (Kunst- und Wunderkammer) is an unrivalled cultural monument.

Above the Lower Castle is the famous Spanish Hall (Spanischer Saal), a notable example of German Renaissance architecture, which contains an intricate wood-inlay ceiling and walls adorned with 27 full-length portraits of the rulers of Tyrol. The Upper Castle contains the extensive Habsburg Portrait gallery (Habsburger Porträtgalerie) featuring paintings of numerous members of the House of Austria and other leading ruling European dynasties, including, as a remarkable feature, many portraits of princely children.

== History ==
Long before Innsbruck became a city, references to an Amras or Omras appeared in documents dating from the 10th century. This early fortification in what was then the southwest corner of Bavaria was the seat of power of the Counts of Andechs, who became Margraves of Istria and later Dukes of the short-lived Imperial State of Merania from 1180 to 1248. This original fortification was destroyed in 1133 and no traces of it remain, although some of the material from the original structure was later used in the modern building. In 1248, the castle ruins and property passed by inheritance from the Counts of Andechs to Albert IV, Count of Tyrol.

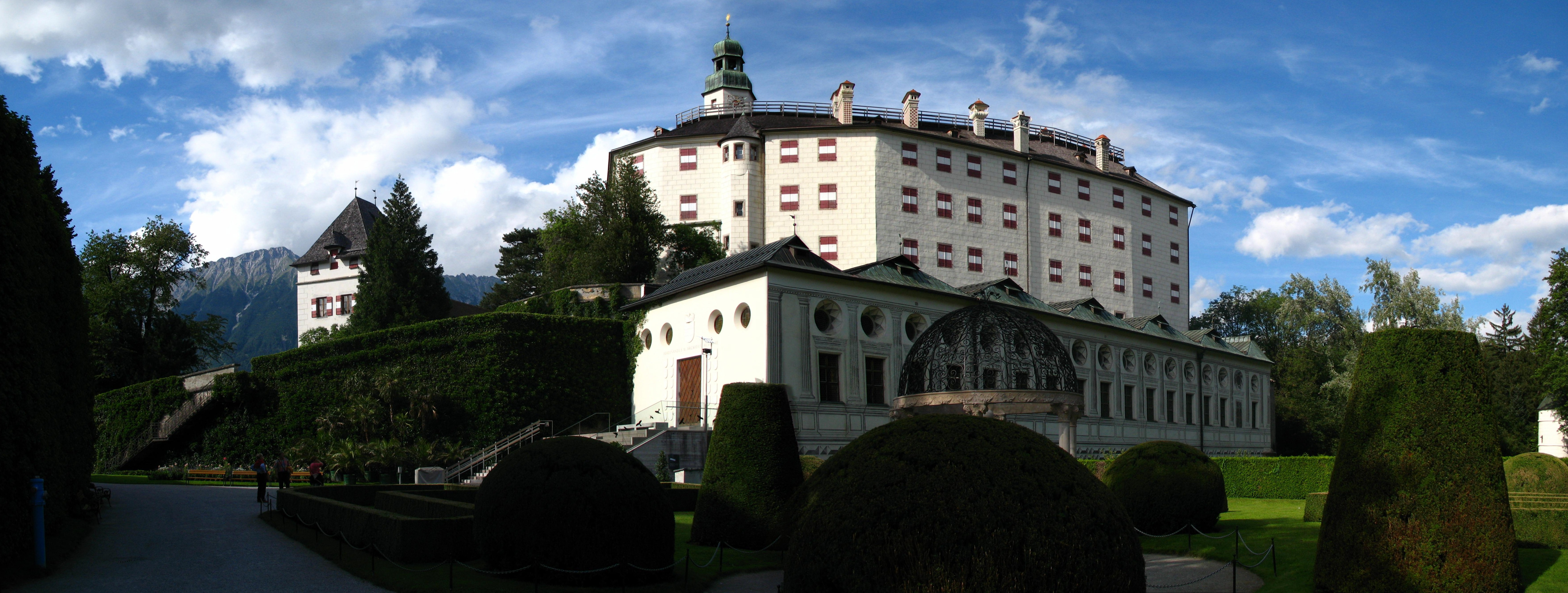
Ambras Castle

The modern Ambras Castle was built by Archduke Ferdinand II (1529–1595), the second son of Emperor Ferdinand I. When he was made provincial sovereign of Tyrol in 1564, Ferdinand II ordered two Italian architects to turn the existing medieval fortress into a Renaissance castle for his untitled wife Philippine Welser (1527–1580), whom he had married in secret. (Note: Originally considered a possible groom for two queens, Mary Tudor and Mary Stewart, Ferdinand II chose to marry the untitled Philippine Welser, the daughter of an Augsburg patrician and businessman. Although considered valid according to church law, marriages between the nobility and untitled persons according to German legal codes of that time was a punishable offence. Ferdinand II did not inform his father of the secret marriage until two years after the wedding.) Ferdinand II prepared his family's residence in the Upper Castle, beneath which he constructed one of the most artistically important halls of the late Renaissance—known as the "Spanish Hall" since the nineteenth century. In 1567, Ferdinand II made his entry into Innsbruck, prior to that, he was appointed administrating governor of the Kingdom of Bohemia, taking up residence in Prague in 1547. In 1589, he added an additional building, the Heldenrüstkammer, west of the Lower Castle for the purpose of housing his collection of "Heroes", the very first systematic presentation of objects in the history of museums. Ambras Castle was used as the residence of Philippine as well as a place for Ferdinand II to house his collection of weapons, suits of armour, portraits, natural objects, as well as rarities and precious objects. Today, the art history museum is part of the Kunsthistorisches Museum Vienna.

Philippine became a popular and beloved figure through her charity and willingness to help others, particularly the common people of Tyrol. Even the nobility brought their petitions to the former commoner. As signs of affection, people addressed their written petitions to "Merciful Miss" or "serene Princess Mrs. Philippine of Austria". After Ferdinand's death in 1595, the second son of Ferdinand and Philippine, Charles, Margrave of Burgau, inherited Ambras Castle. With little interest in preserving the castle or its collections, they fell into a state of dilapidation and Charles sold them in 1606 to Emperor Rudolf II. The emperor residing in Prague left his uncle's collection nearly in its entirety at Ambras Castle, as he himself was one of the most important Habsburg collectors.

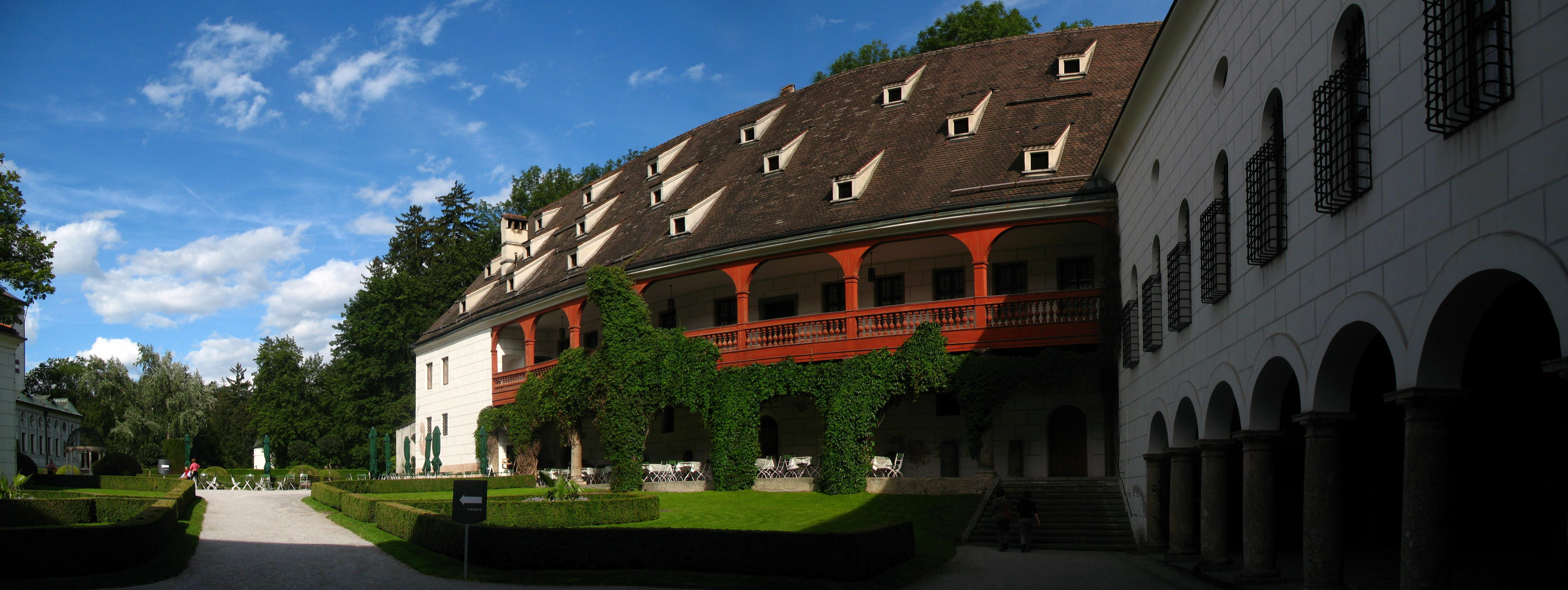
Ambras Castle

In the following years, Ambras Castle no longer had the status of an official residence and was seldom lived in. Inadequate preservation measures led to the loss of valuable books, manuscripts, and hand sketches, and soon the palace fell largely into disrepair. In the seventeenth century, Emperor Leopold I (1640–1705) had some of the most valuable holdings of the Ambras collections—mostly books and manuscripts—moved to Vienna, where they can still be seen at the Austrian National Library. In 1805, the remaining Ambras collections were threatened by the defeat of Austria by the French Empire. Fortunately, after he recognized the private-law character of the Ambras collection, Napoleon (1769–1821) had it brought to safety in Vienna.

In 1855, Archduke Karl Ludwig, then governor of Tyrol, had the palace remodeled to use as a summer residence. Significant changes were made during this time to the palace and the surrounding park. The Outer Bailey (Vorschloss) was constructed with an ivy-clad entrance ramp for carriages. The park was redesigned as an English garden. Following Archduke Karl Ludwig's renouncement of his succession rights in 1889, (Note: Following the death of his nephew Crown Prince Rudolf of Austria (1858–1889), Karl Ludwig became heir presumptive to Austria-Hungary Empire. He renounced his succession rights a few days later in favour of his eldest son, Franz Ferdinand.) the palace fell once again into ruinous condition. In 1880, it was converted into a museum and subsequently renovated.

In 1919, following the dissolution of Austria-Hungary, Ambras Castle became the property of the First Austrian Republic. In 1950, the Kunsthistorisches Museum took over the administration of the castle and its collections. Throughout the 1970s, a comprehensive restoration took place of the Spanish Hall, the Upper Castle residential quarters, and the inner courtyard. In 1974, the Chamber of Art and Wonders was completed. In 1976, the Habsburg Portrait Gallery covering the fifteenth to nineteenth centuries was completed. In 1981, the Armouries was reopened in the Lower Castle.

== Collections ==
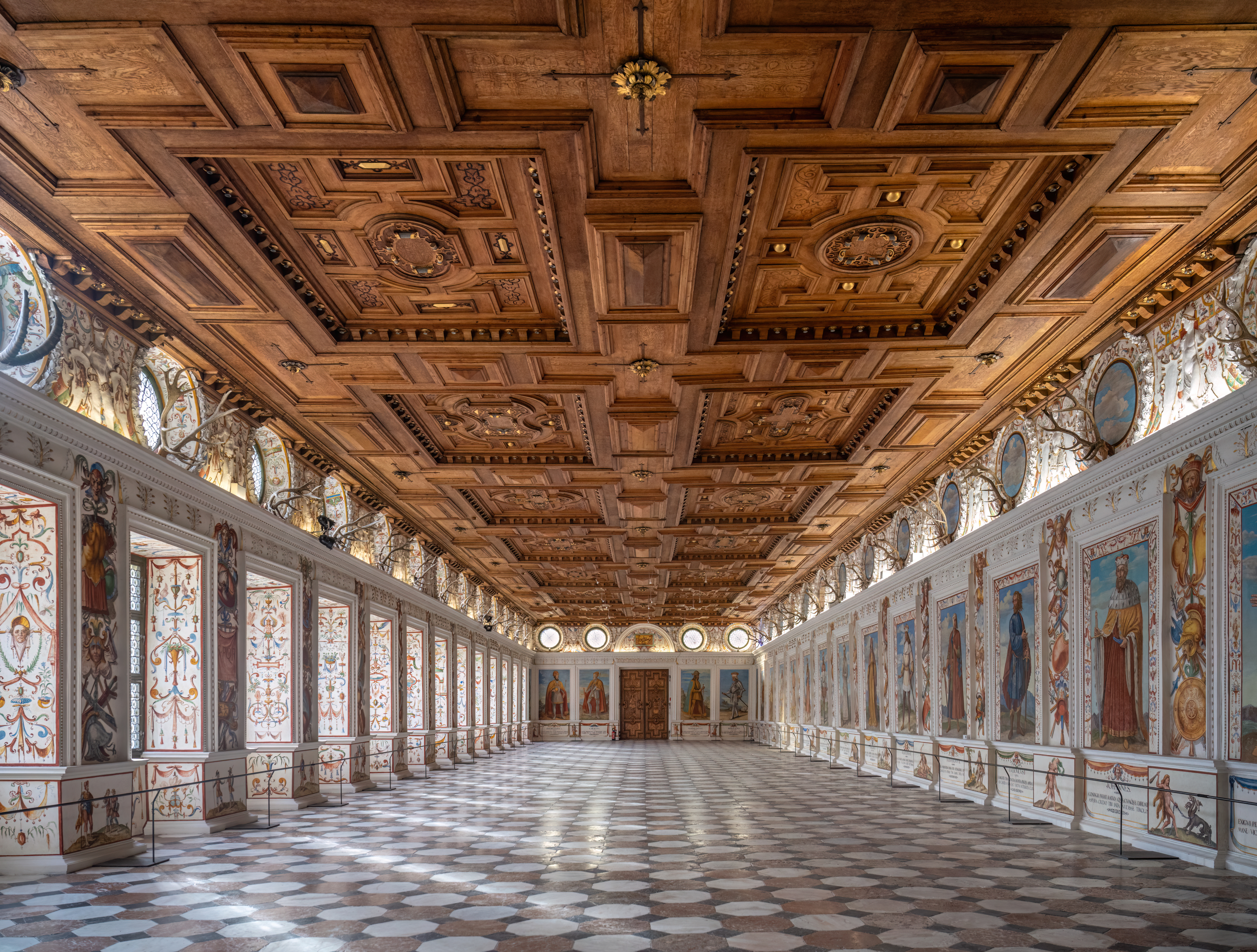
Spanish Hall

Ambras Castle is a federal museum of the Republic of Austria. It is administratively part of the Kunsthistorisches Museum Vienna and belongs to the KHM-Museumsverband.

Ferdinand II was one of the most important patrons of the Habsburg family. He founded the notable collections of Ambras and had a museum built for them in the rooms of the "Lower Castle", which was constructed according to the most advanced ideas of his time. The three Armouries and the Chamber of Art and Wonders were designed and used as a museum from the beginning.

=== Spanish Hall ===
The Spanish Hall, built between 1569 and 1572, is one of the most important freestanding halls of the Renaissance. The picturesque layout of the 43-metre (141 ft) long hall is dominated by the 27 full-length portraits of the princely rulers of the Tyrol. Today classical concerts take place in this hall.

=== Chamber of Art and Wonders ===
The Chamber of Art and Wonders of Archduke Ferdinand II is the only Renaissance Kunstkammer which can still be seen in its original place. Others had been plundered like the ones in Munich, Prague or Stuttgart, or their character had been changed like in Dresden or Kassel.

In the Chamber of Art and Wonders at Ambras Castle artificialia, naturalia, scientifica, exotica, and mirabilia are to be seen: natural wonders (rare, unique and excellent things of nature) as well as precious objects, scientific items, toys, or luxury items of the time, and so on. In contents the natural and artistic objects represent the programme of the late Renaissance encyclopedic collections. The special thing about the Ambras-collections is, that they are still where they were meant to be seen. Still you can find corals arranged in cabinet-boxes, turnery made of wood or ivory, glass figures, or porcelain and silk paintings which belong to the oldest European collections of Asian, African and American art (exotica).

Also important works of European artists, like the carved "little death" made of wood by Hans Leinberger can be found, as well as typical Kunstkammer - objects like handstones, goblets made of rhinoceros horn, coconut or rock crystal, animals made of bronze, music- and measuring instruments, automats and clocks. A very important part of the collection were portraits of wondrous persons like the hairy people, Vlad Dracula and others.

=== Armouries ===
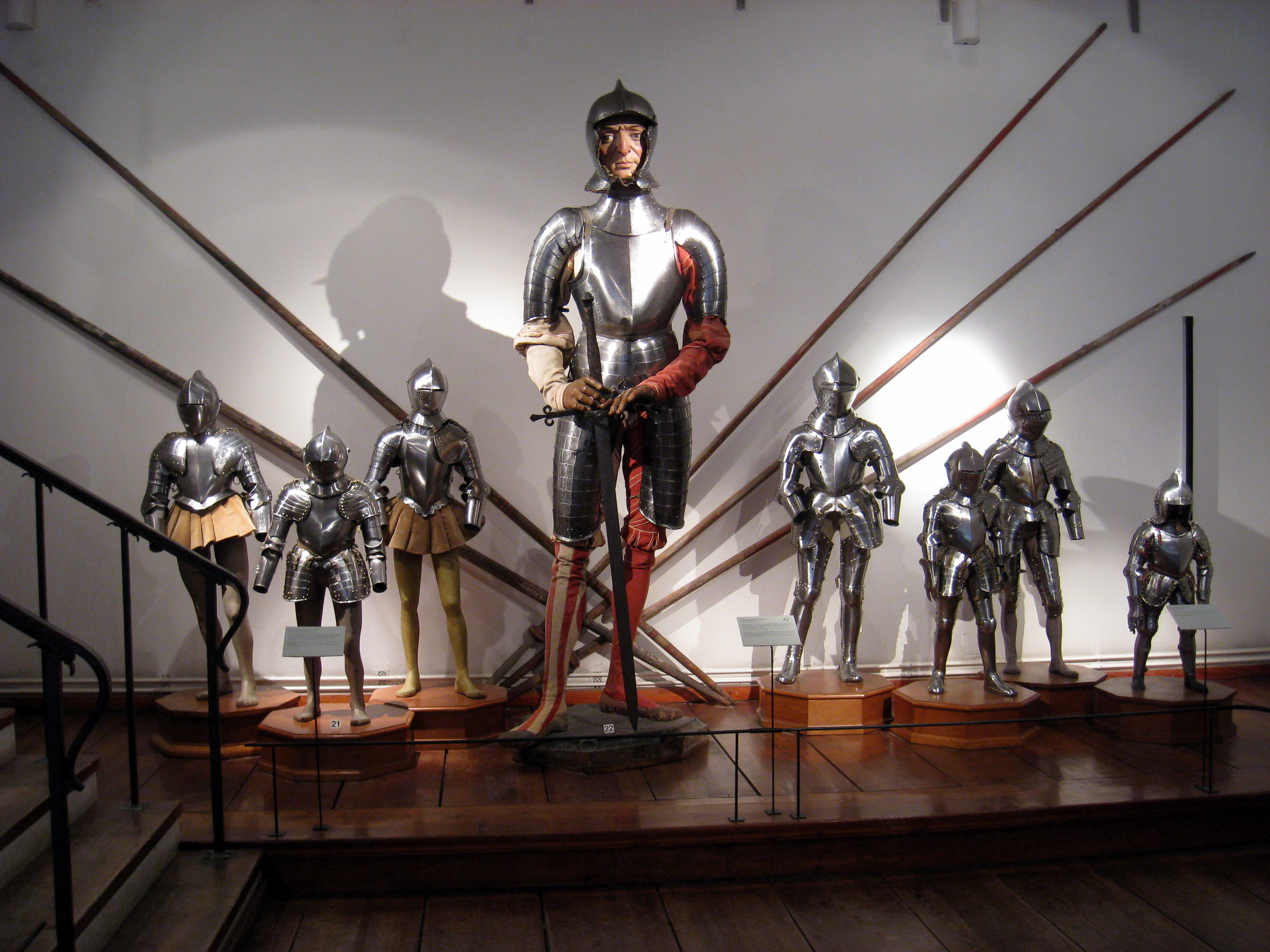
Armor in Ambras Castle

Archduke Ferdinand II's idea of a museum was a novelty: he systematically collected armour from famous personalities of his time. He presented this armour "to the eternal memory" of that persons - mostly military commanders - in the "Heldenrüstkammer" (Heroes' Armoury); some on display today still in the original 16th century showcases. His "Rüstkammern" (Armouries) contain very rare examples of arms and armour from the 15th century which originally came from the collections of Emperor Maximilian I and Archduke Sigismund. Armour for tournaments like the German joust or the German course, and the armour of the court's giant Bartlmä Bon, who took part in the tournament in Vienna in 1560, can be seen. The "Leibrüstkammer" (Court Armoury) includes the archduke's private armour and the armour of the court of Innsbruck. Ferdinand's collection of armour was one of the most important of its kind, not only because of the collection idea, but also because of the quality and quantity of his objects. Today, selected objects still illustrate the museum idea in Innsbruck at Ambras Castle, whereas many of the armour is exhibited at the Hofjagd- und Rüstkammer (Imperial Armoury) of the Kusthistorisches Museum, Vienna.

=== Upper Castle ===
The Upper Castle, the oldest part of Ambras Castle, contains the Habsburg Portrait Gallery. About 300 portraits from the 15th to the 19th century, including King Albert II, Emperor Maximilian I, Charles V and Ferdinand I, to the last emperor of the Holy Roman Empire, Francis II, a contemporary of Napoleon Bonaparte. Because of the various dynastic relations, the collection also shows members of other European dynasties. The portraits were painted by well-known artists such as Lucas Cranach the Elder, Antonis Mor, Titian, Anthony van Dyck and Diego Velázquez.

The Strasser Collection of Glass is amongst the most important of its kind in the world. Built up by Professor Rudolf Strasser over a period of more than fifty years this collection includes valuable Renaissance and Baroque Period glasses from Europe's most important glass producing regions, for example Venice, Bohemia, Hall, Innsbruck and Silesia. The high quality of the collection is quite comparable with the collection of these epochs in the Corning Museum of Glass.

The Collection of Gothic Sculpture presents objects date from the time of Emperor Maximilian I (1459–1519). The main work is the imposing St George altar-piece which was made by Sebold Bocksdorfer commissioned by Maximilian and important for the Habsburg's Order of Saint George.

The Inner Courtyard, decorated between 1564 and 1567 with grisaille painting al fresco (grey painting on still-wet plaster), is among the best-preserved examples of fresco from the sixteenth century. The representations of princely virtues and muses, female and male heroes, and diverse heroic acts sought to display the royalty as exemplary. They relate to their commissioner Archduke Ferdinand II, patron of the arts and host of lavish festivities.

In cultural historical terms the Bathing Chambers of Philippine Welser, the only bath of the 16th century completely preserved, is something of a cultural heritage.

The Chapel is dedicated to St. Nicholas. Consecrated for the first time in 1330 and often rebuilt over the centuries, it was finally painted in the 19th century by the Innsbruck painter August von Wörndle.

== Ambras Castle silver coin ==
Ambras Castle is so popular and well known, that it was the subject of one of the best known famous silver collectors' coins: the 10 euro Ambras Castle coin.

On the obverse of the coin there is a general view of the castle to the south of Innsbruck with its Renaissance style gardens forms the central design. On the reverse, three court musicians cross the floor of the Spanish Hall, based on a picture from 1569. This design recalls the court festivals for which Fedinand II had the Spanish Hall specially constructed.

== See also ==
- Ambraser Heldenbuch

== Gallery ==
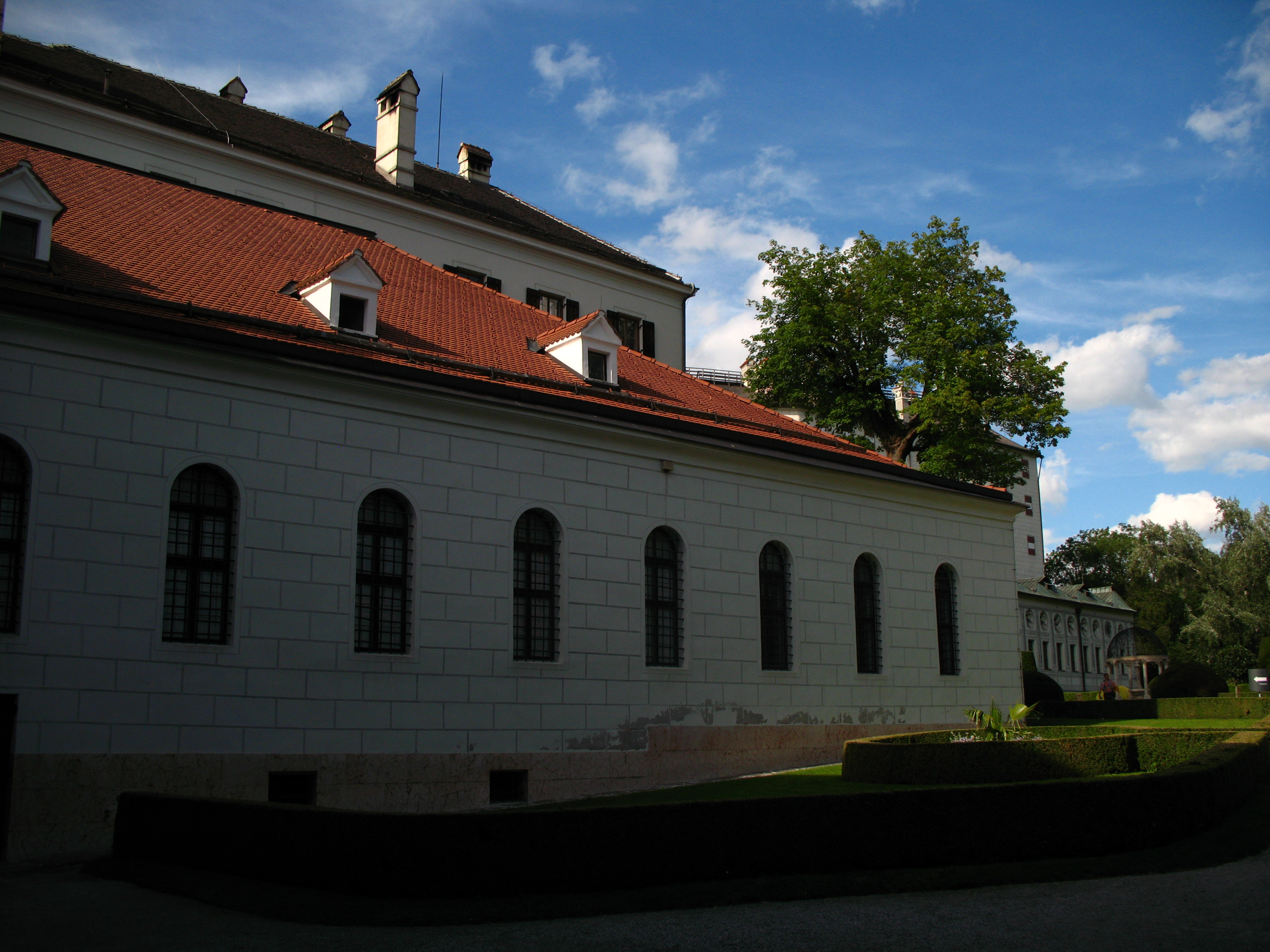
Ambras Castle

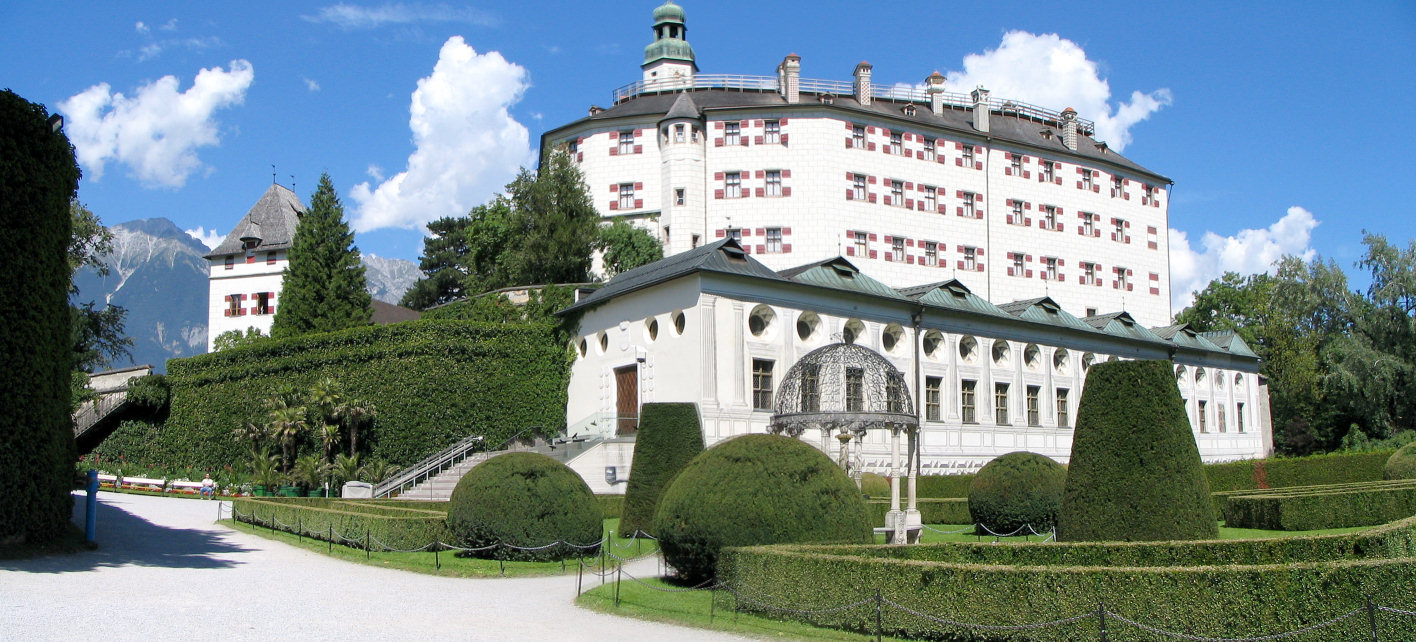
Ambras Castle

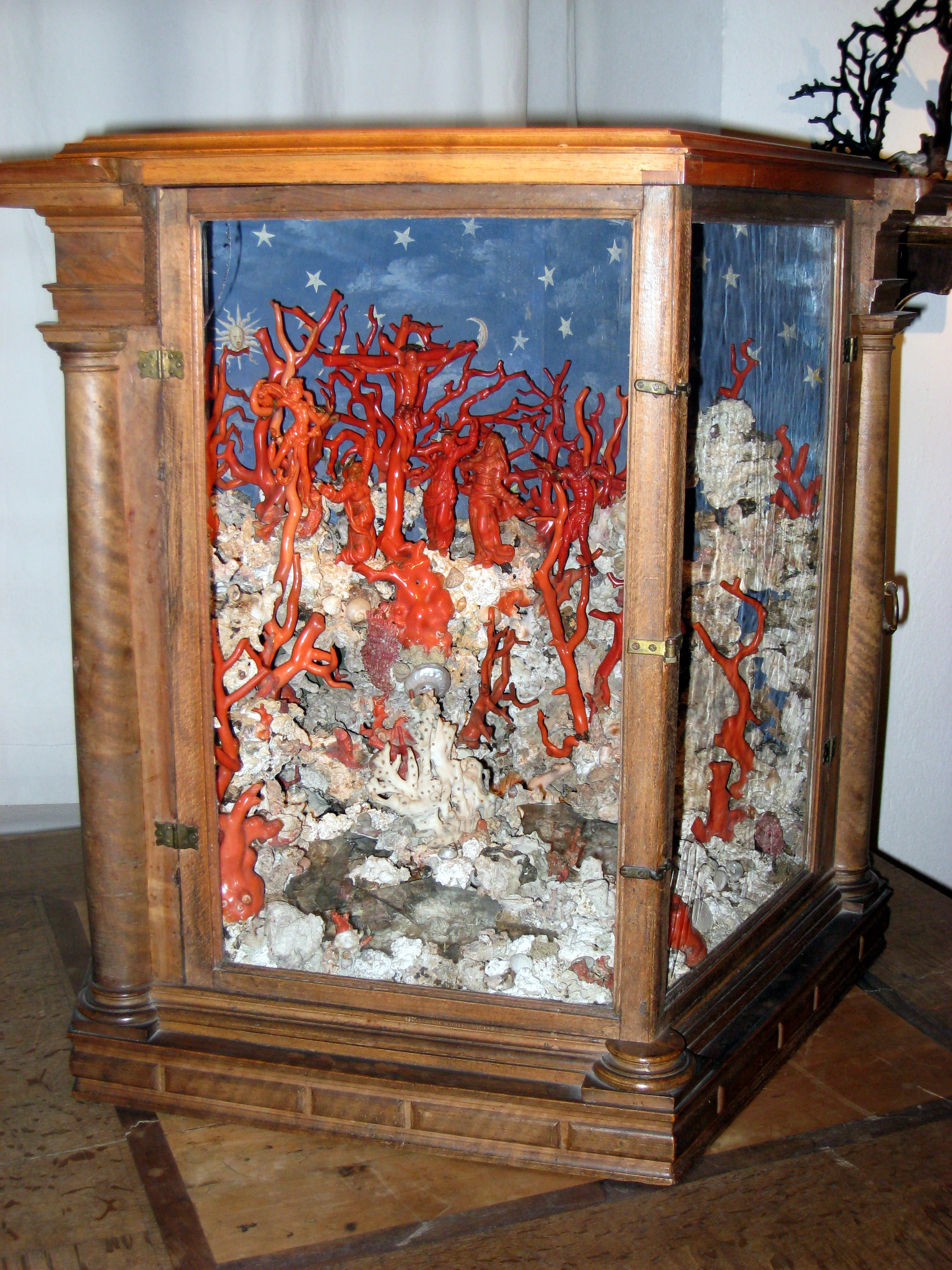
Coral crucifix

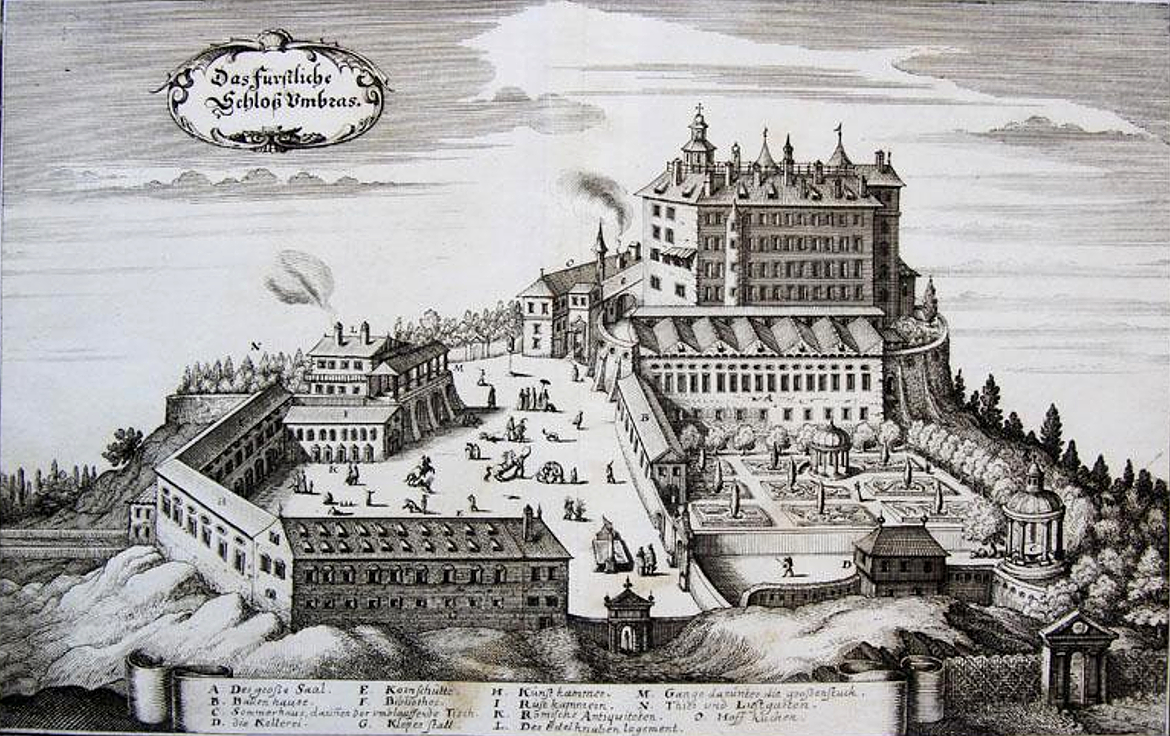
Engraving by Matthäus Merian, c. 1650

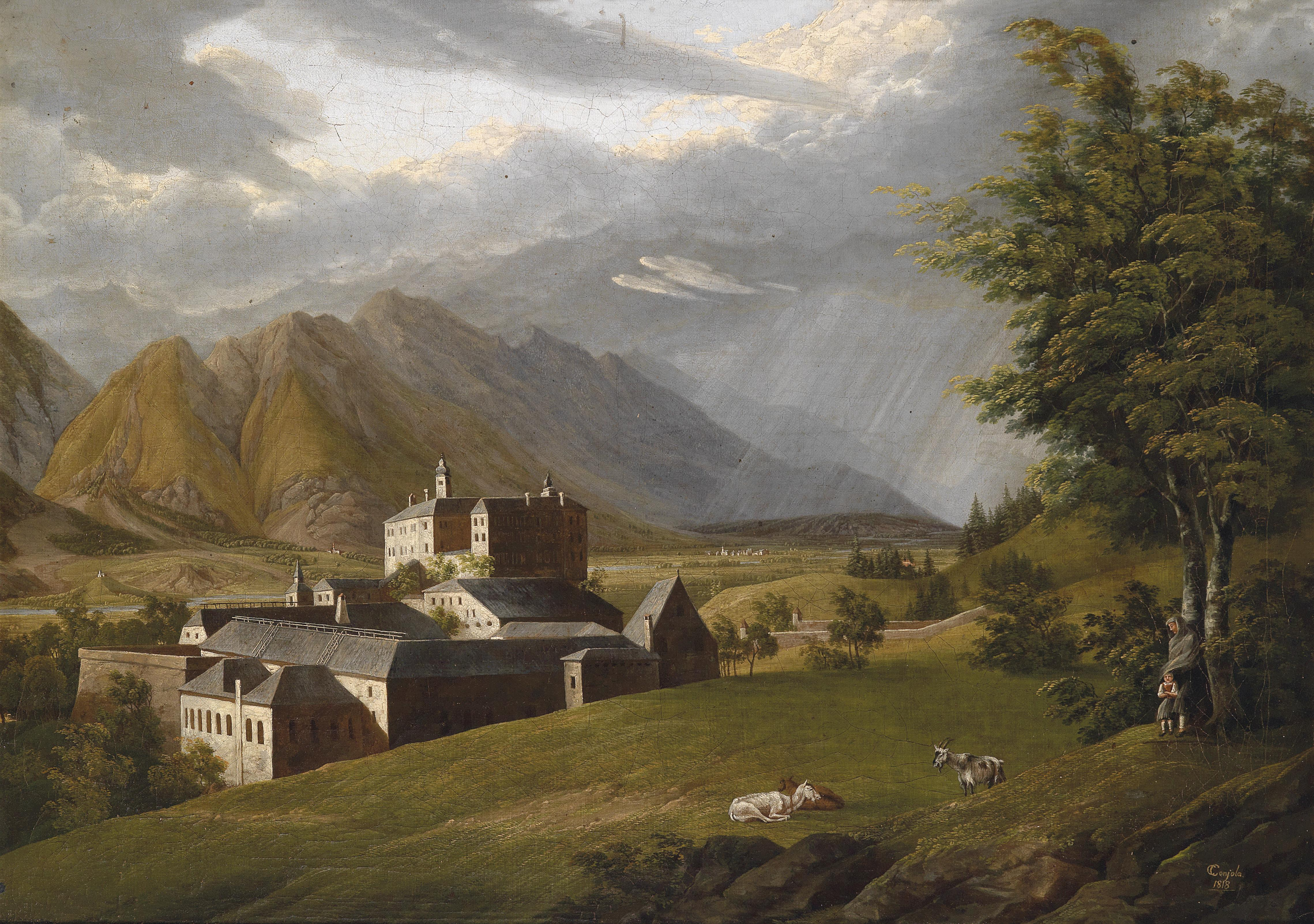
Painting by Carl Conjola, 1818

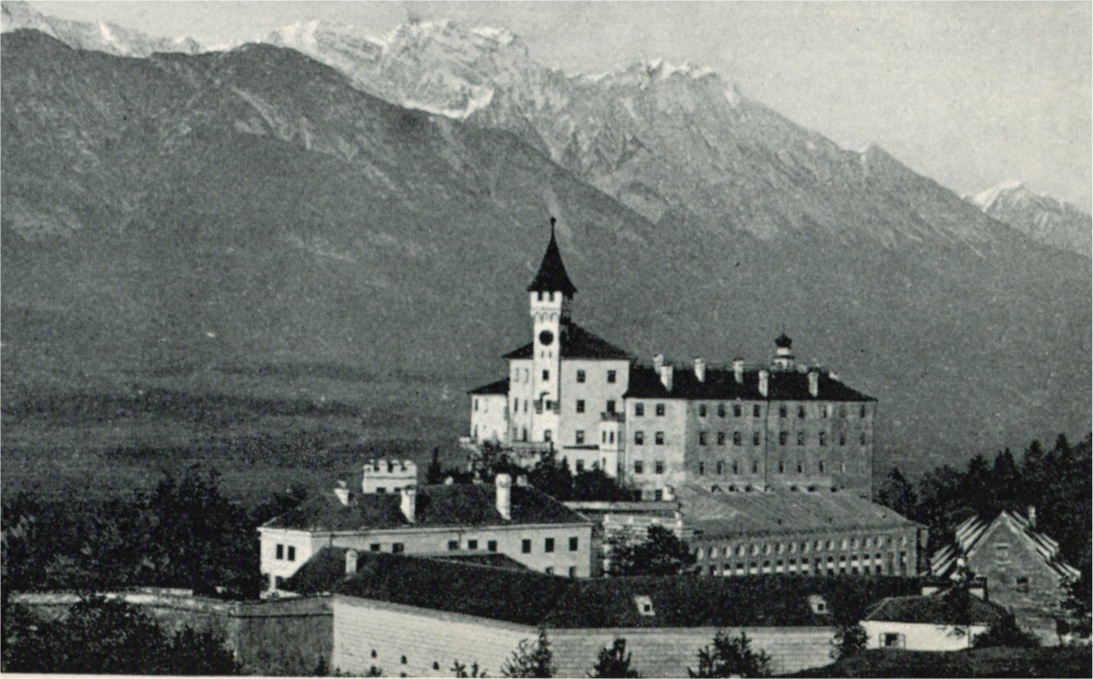
Photograph by Anton Gratl, 1898

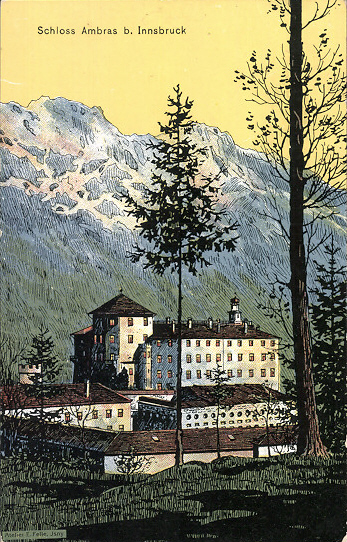
Postcard, early twentieth century

Ambras Castle silver coin
