= Helmschmied =

Medieval German family of armourers

Helmschmied Helmschmid
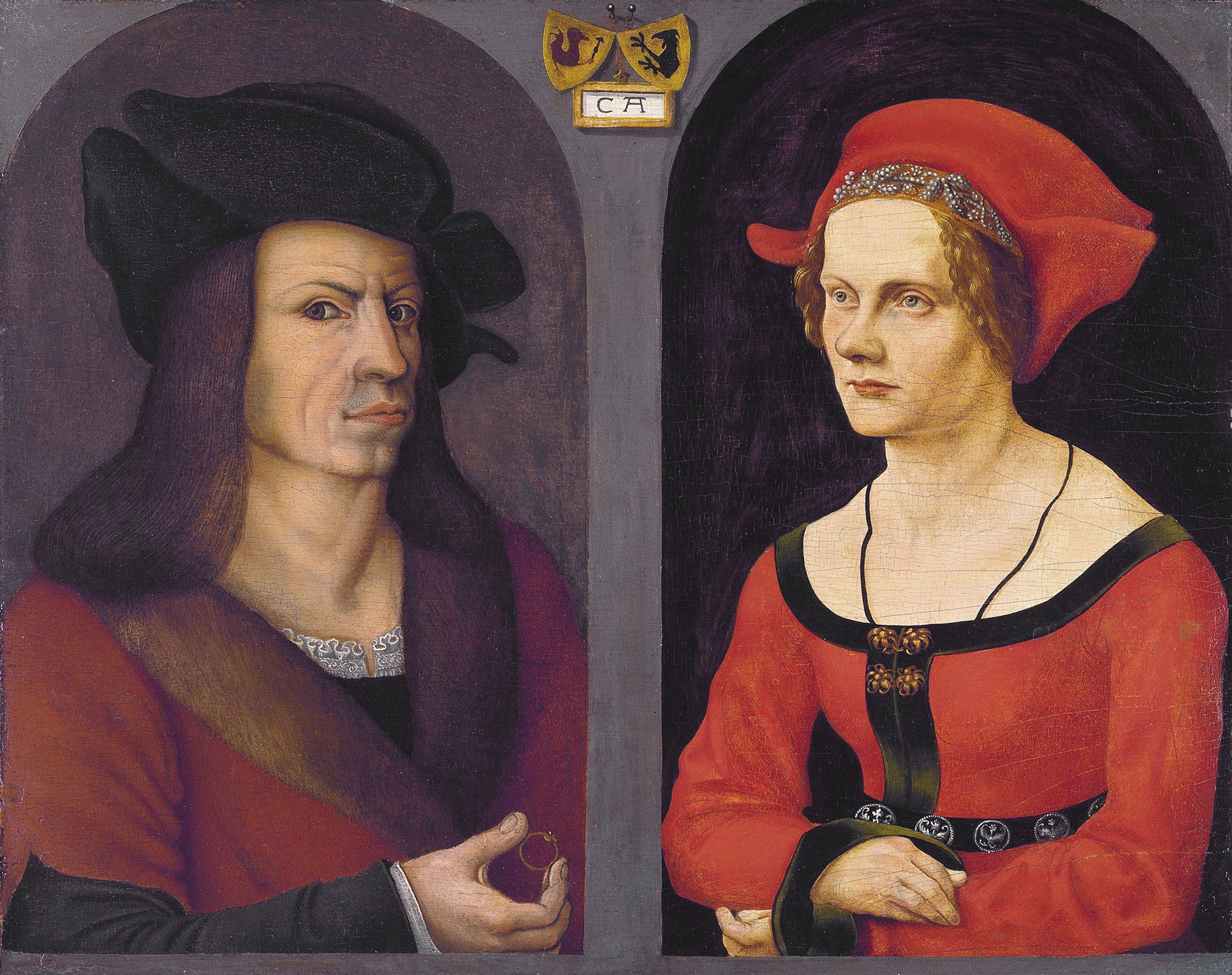
- Kolman Helmschmied and Agnes Breu. Wedding portrait by Jörg Breu the Elder.
- Country: Holy Roman Empire Duchy of Milan
- Origin: Augsburg
- Founded: c. 1475
- Members: Lorenz Helmschmied Kolman Helmschmied Desiderius Kolman Helmschmied
- Dissolution: c. 1600

The Helmschmied family of Augsburg were one of late medieval and Renaissance Europe's foremost families of armourers. Their name, often spelled Helmschmid in historical sources, modern scholarship, and museum collections, translates to helmet smith. The family's most prominent members were Lorenz Helmschmied (floruit 1467-1515), Kolman Helmschmied (1471–1532) and Desiderius Kolman Helmschmied (1513–1579).

The Helmschmieds made armour for the high nobility of the Holy Roman Empire, including multiple emperors, for rulers of the Spanish Empire, for the archdukes of Austria and Tyrol, as well as other wealthy clients. They competed for fame and noble patronage with the other two most prominent late 15th century European armour smith families, the Seusenhofers of Innsbruck (Austria) and the Missaglias of Milan.

Many works that the Helmschmieds made for Charles V, Holy Roman Emperor and Philip II of Spain are preserved in the Royal Armoury of Madrid, and many of their other works are kept in the Kunsthistorisches Museum in Vienna.

== Gallery ==
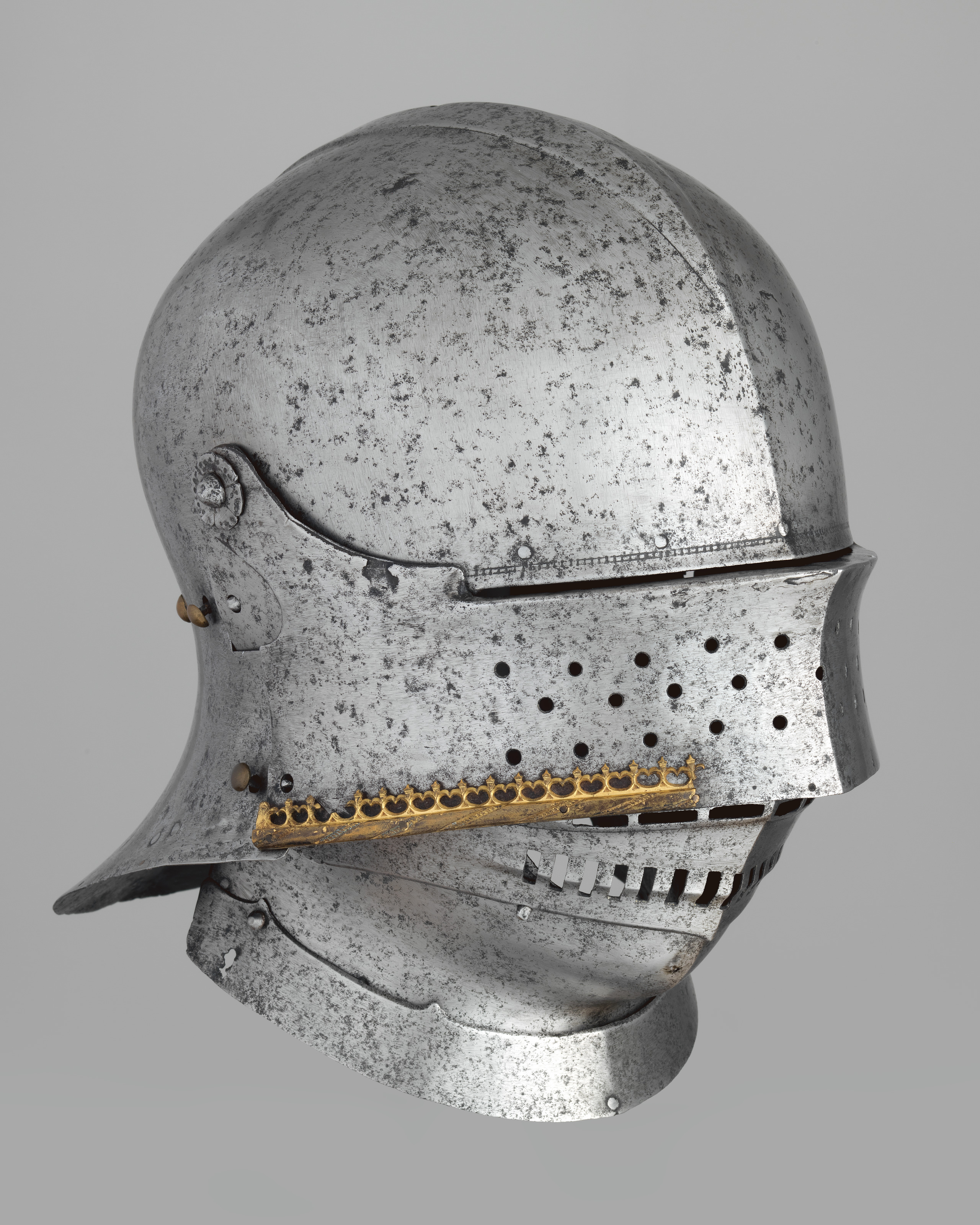
Sallet helmet made for Holy Roman Emperor Maximilian I

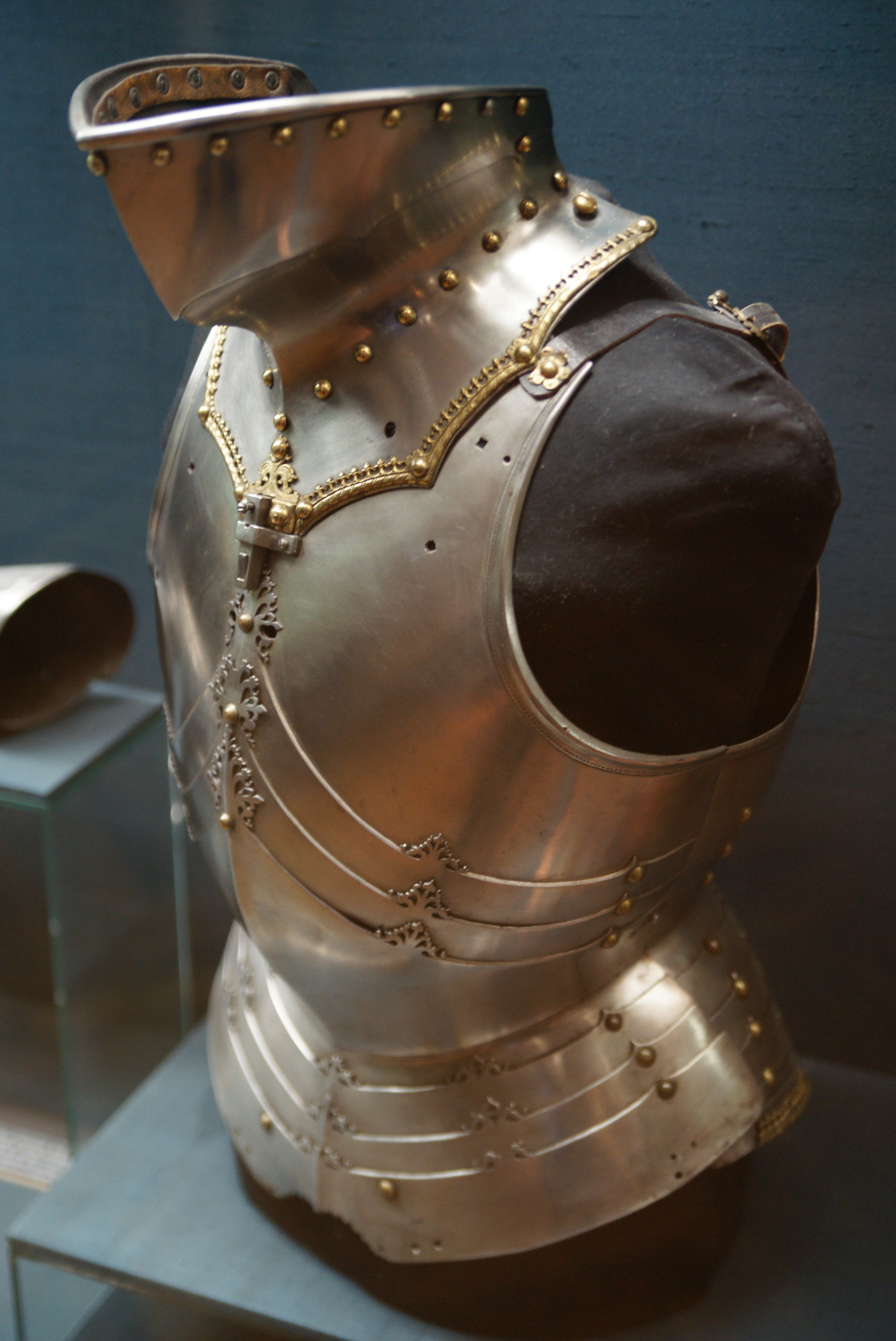
Armour made for Maximillian I

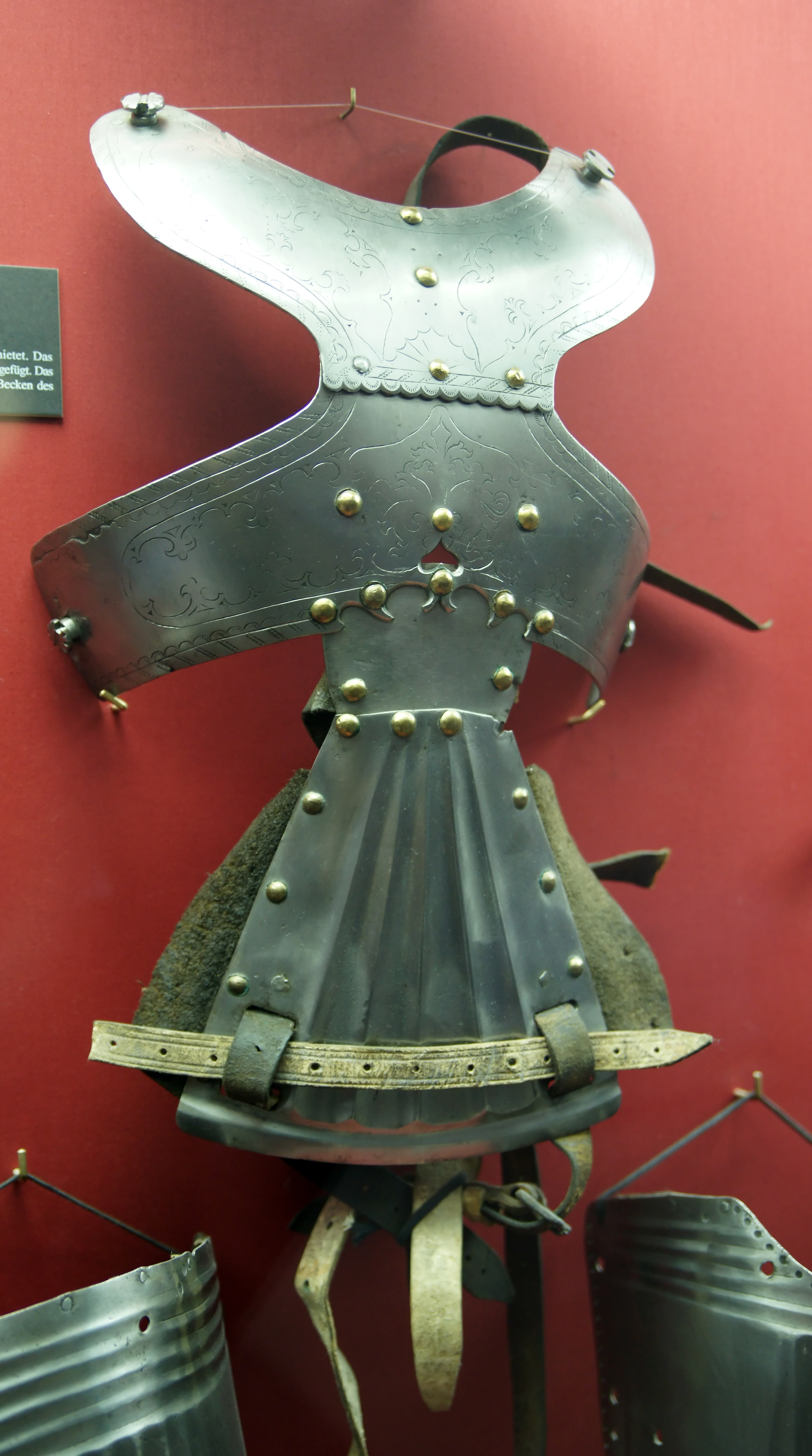
Horse racing armour made for Maximillian I

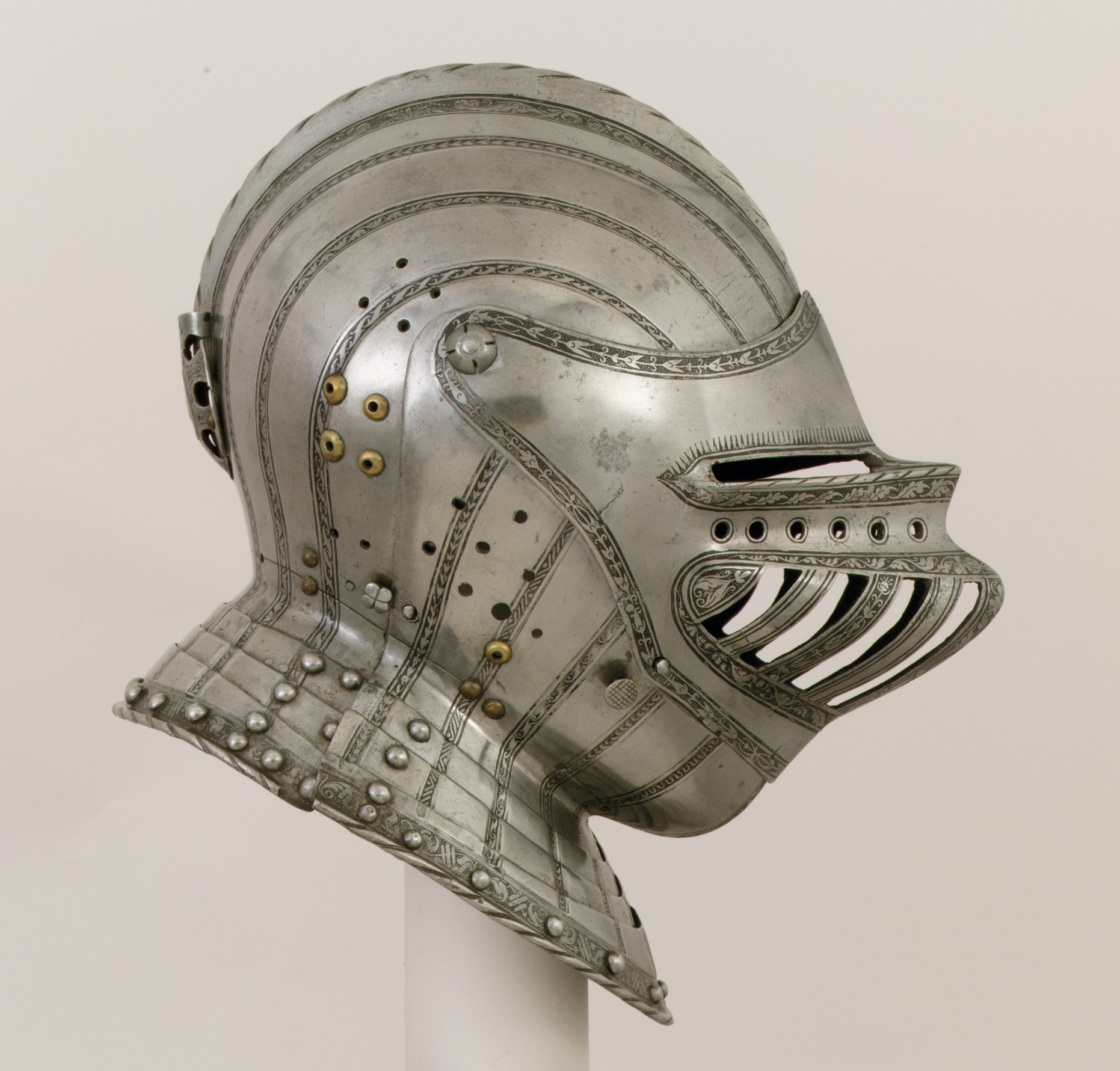
Helmet made for a young boy

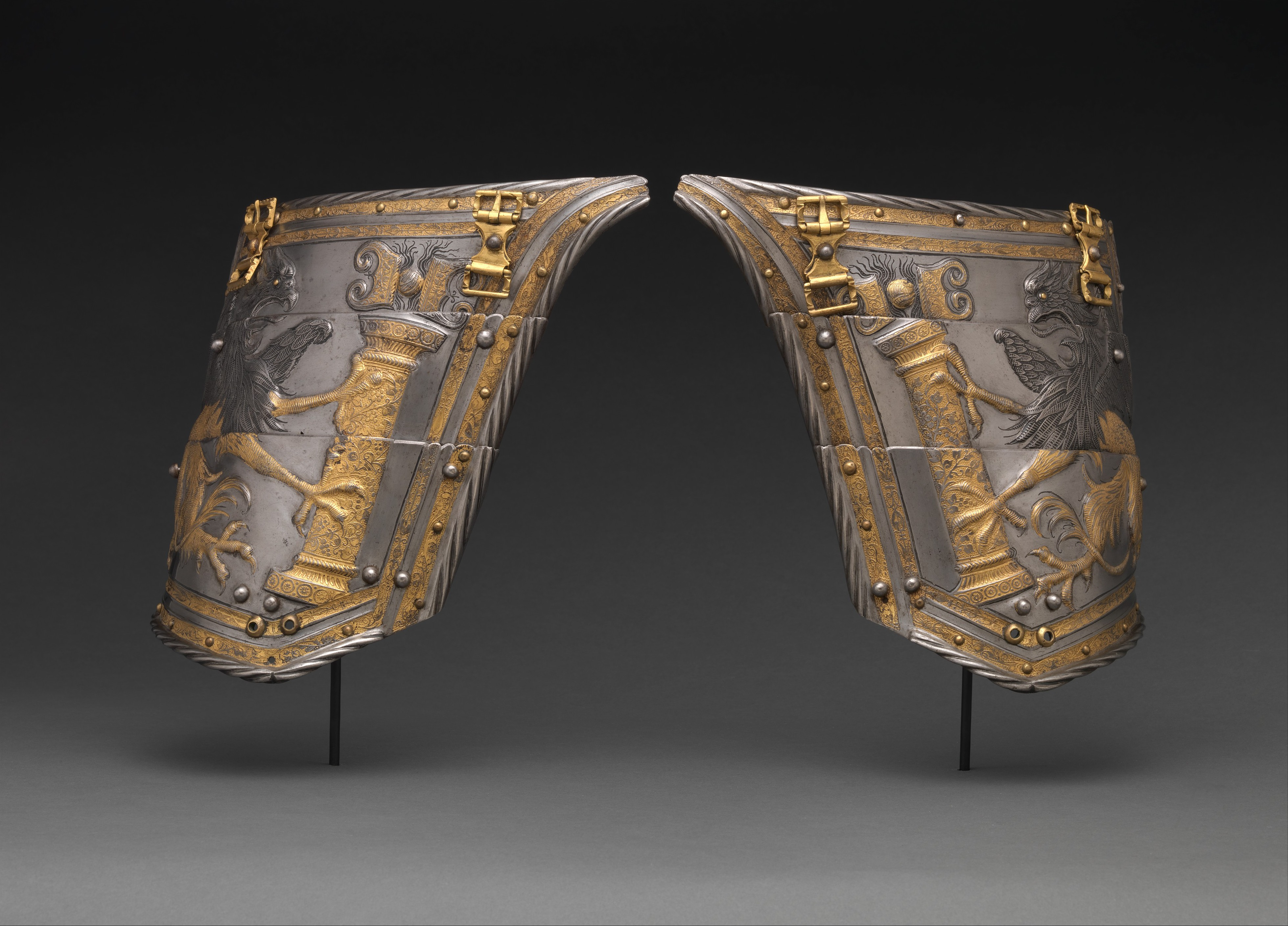
Pair of tassets made for Holy Roman Emperor Charles V

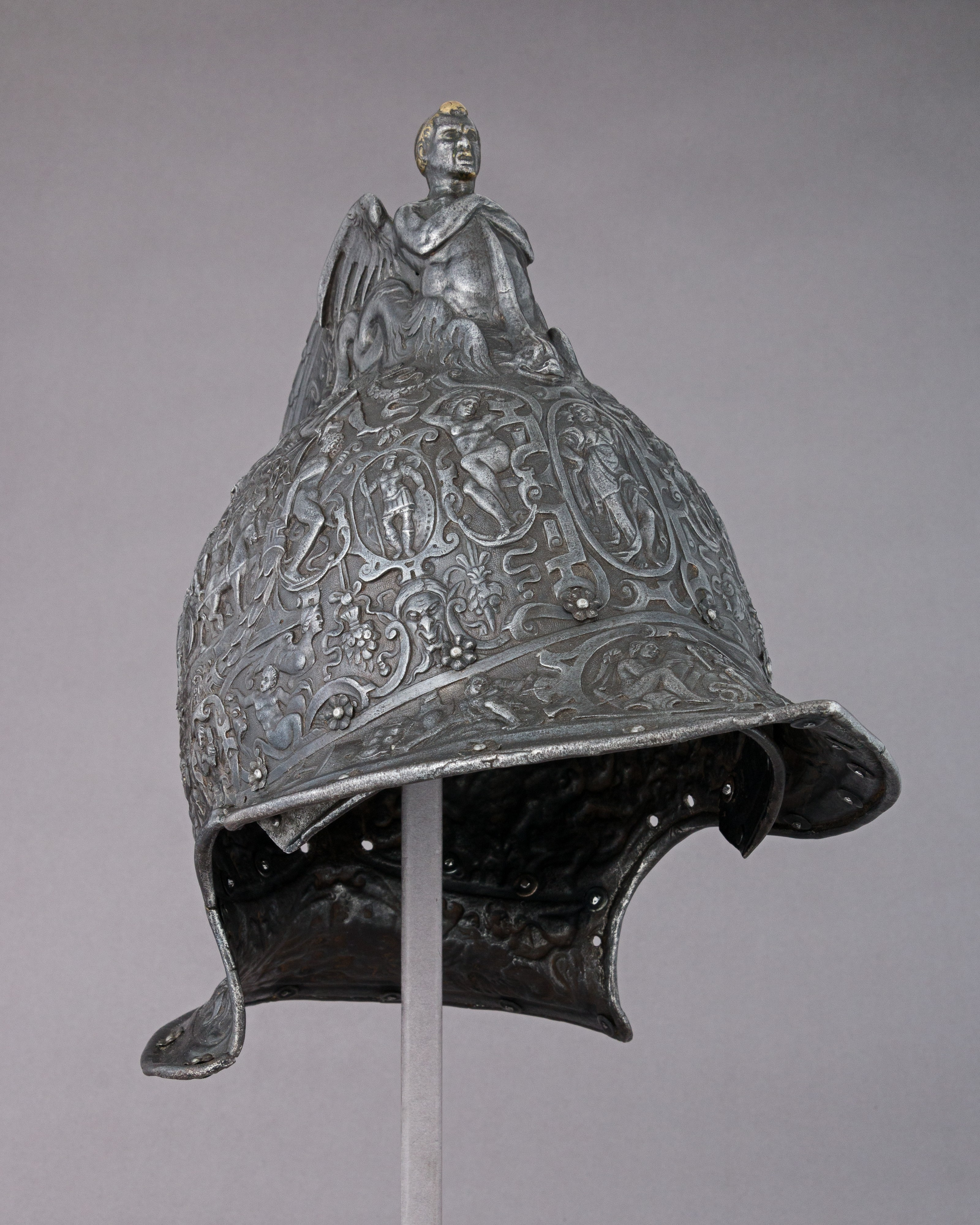
Burgonet helmet

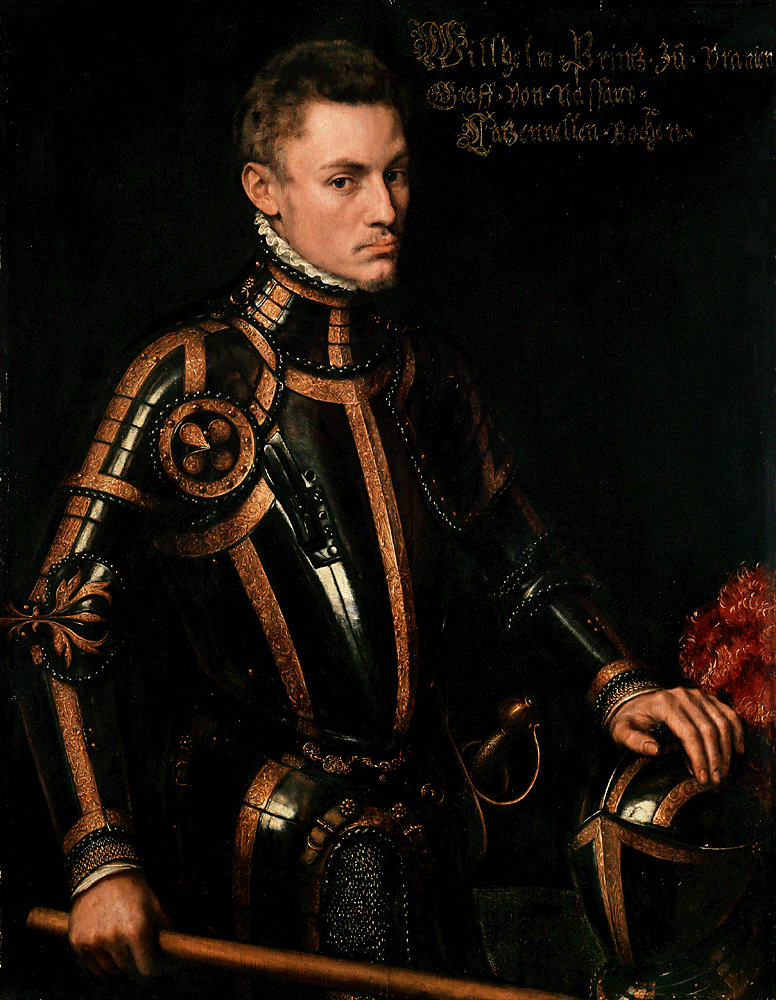
William the Silent (William of Orange) wearing Helmschmied armour

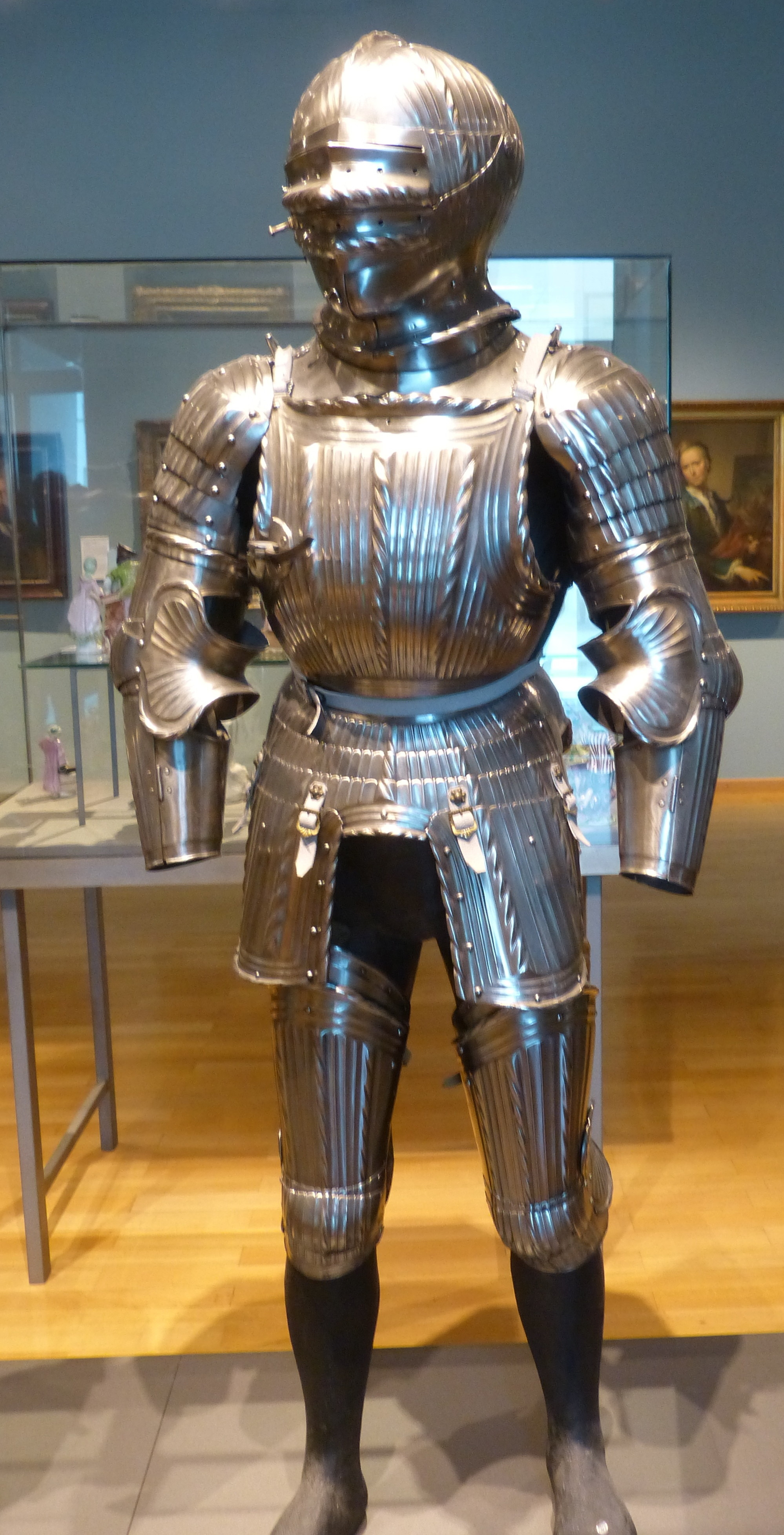
Armour made for Archduke Ferdinand I, who would later become Holy Roman Emperor
