= Barding =

Body armour for a war horse

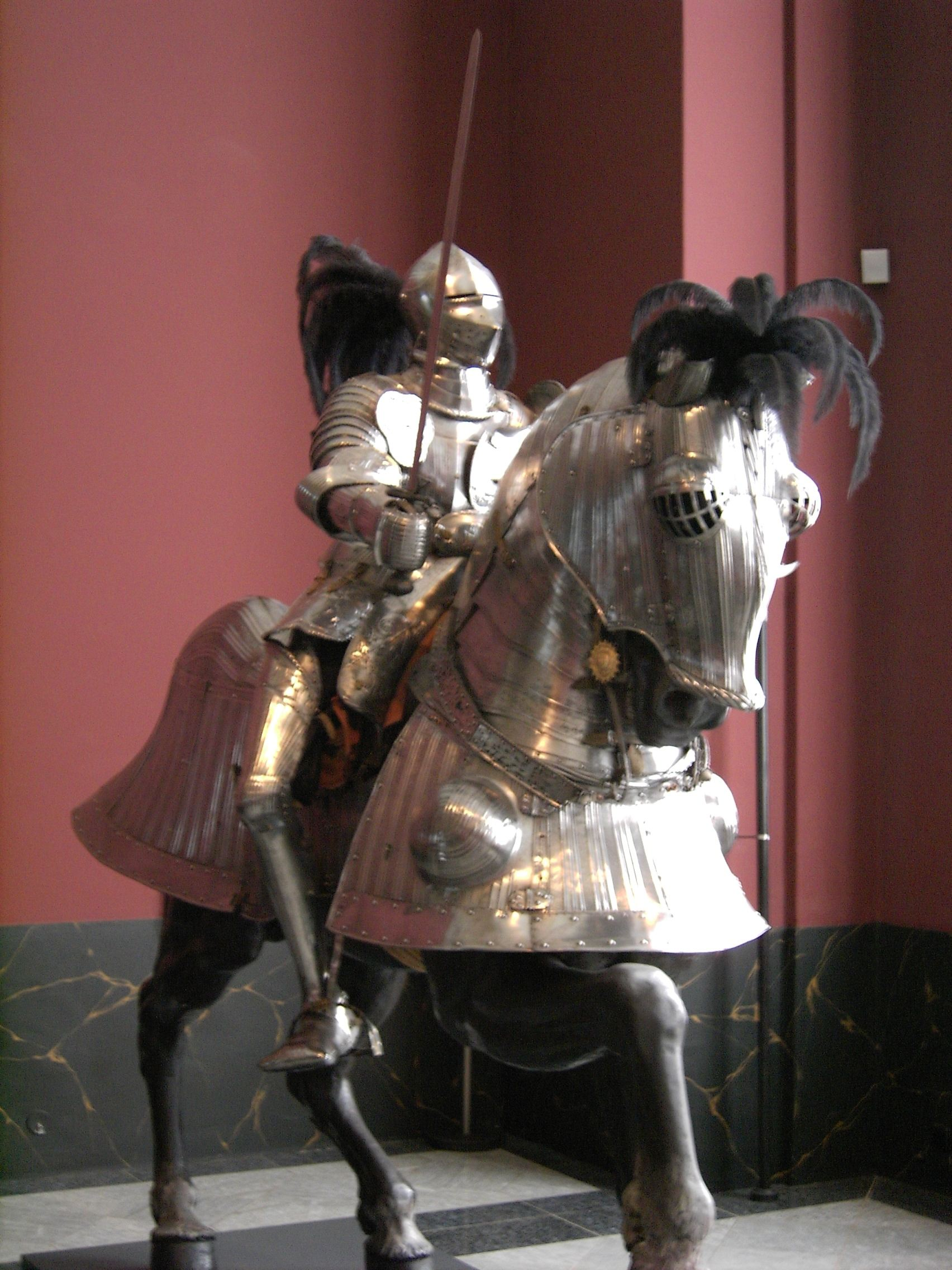
A museum display of a sixteenth-century knight with an armoured horse

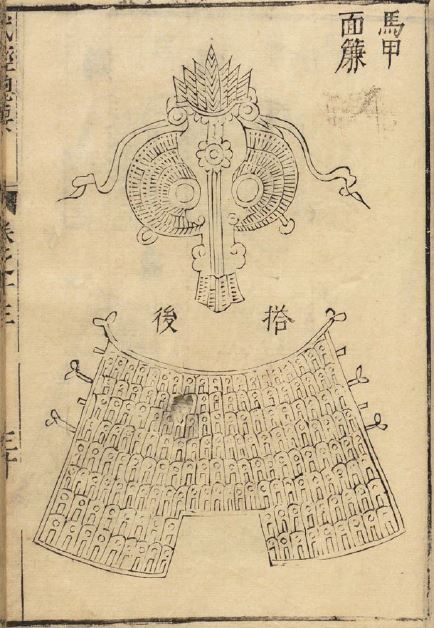
Chinese Song dynasty lamellar horse barding as illustrated on Wujing Zongyao

Barding (also spelled bard or barb) is body armour for war horses. The practice of armoring horses first developed extensively in antiquity in the Asian kingdoms of Parthia and Pahlava. After the conquests of Alexander the Great in the 4th century BC it likely made its way - along with cataphract technology - into European military practices via the Seleucid Empire and later the Byzantine Empire. Though its historical roots lie in antiquity in the regions of what was once the Persian Empire, barded horses have become a symbol of the late European Middle Ages chivalry and the era of knights.

Examples of armour for horses could be found as far back as classical antiquity. Many historians believe that cataphracts, with scale armour for both rider and horse, influenced the later European knights, via contact with the Byzantine Empire.

During the Late Middle Ages as armour protection for knights became more effective, their mounts became targets. This vulnerability was exploited by the Scots at the Battle of Bannockburn in the 14th century, when horses were killed by the infantry, and by the English at the Battle of Crécy in the same century where long-bowmen shot horses and the then dismounted French knights were killed by heavy infantry. Barding developed as a response to such events.

The full bard was developed by Lorenz Helmschmied and Konrad Seusenhofer for Maximilian I, who used them extensively for propagandic and aesthetic purposes, as well as diplomatic gifts.

Surviving period examples of barding are rare; however, complete sets are on display at the Philadelphia Museum of Art, the Wallace Collection in London, the Royal Armouries in Leeds, and the Metropolitan Museum of Art in New York. Horse armour could be made in whole or in part of cuir bouilli (hardened leather), but surviving examples of this are especially rare.

== Cataphracts ==
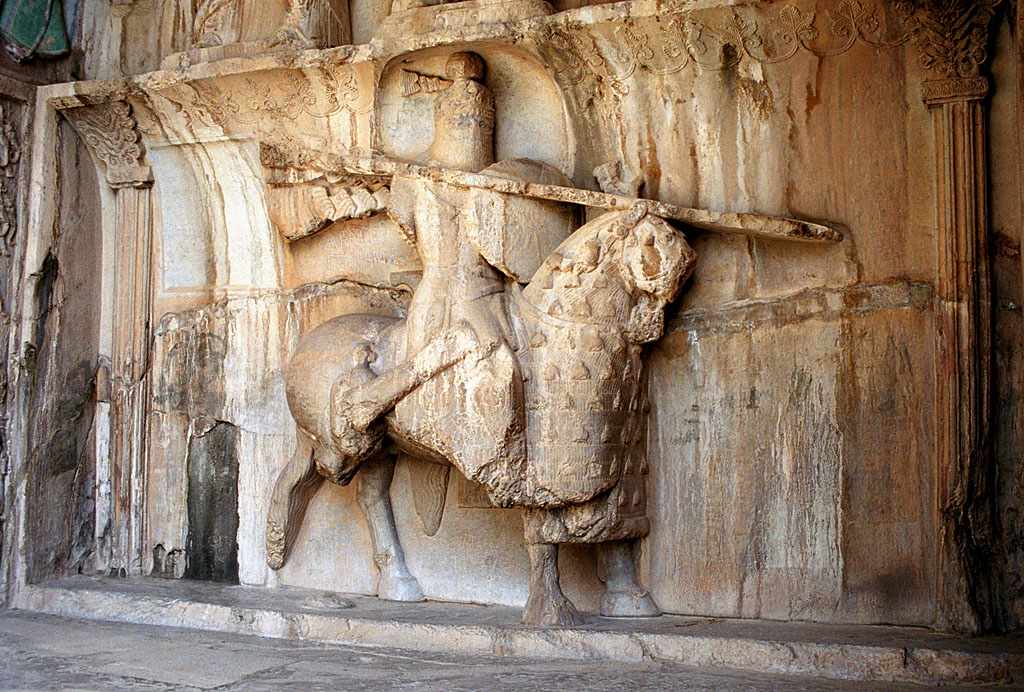
Taq-e Bostan: equestrian statue of Khosrow II as a cataphract

A cataphract was a cavalryman in full armour riding a horse that was partially or fully armoured. This type of cavalry originated in central Asia and was adopted by the eastern satrapies of the ancient Persian Empire.

The Seleucid cataphract used scale armour because of its flexibility and effective protection against archers and also because, unlike regular metal types, it was not too heavy for the horses.

== European barding ==
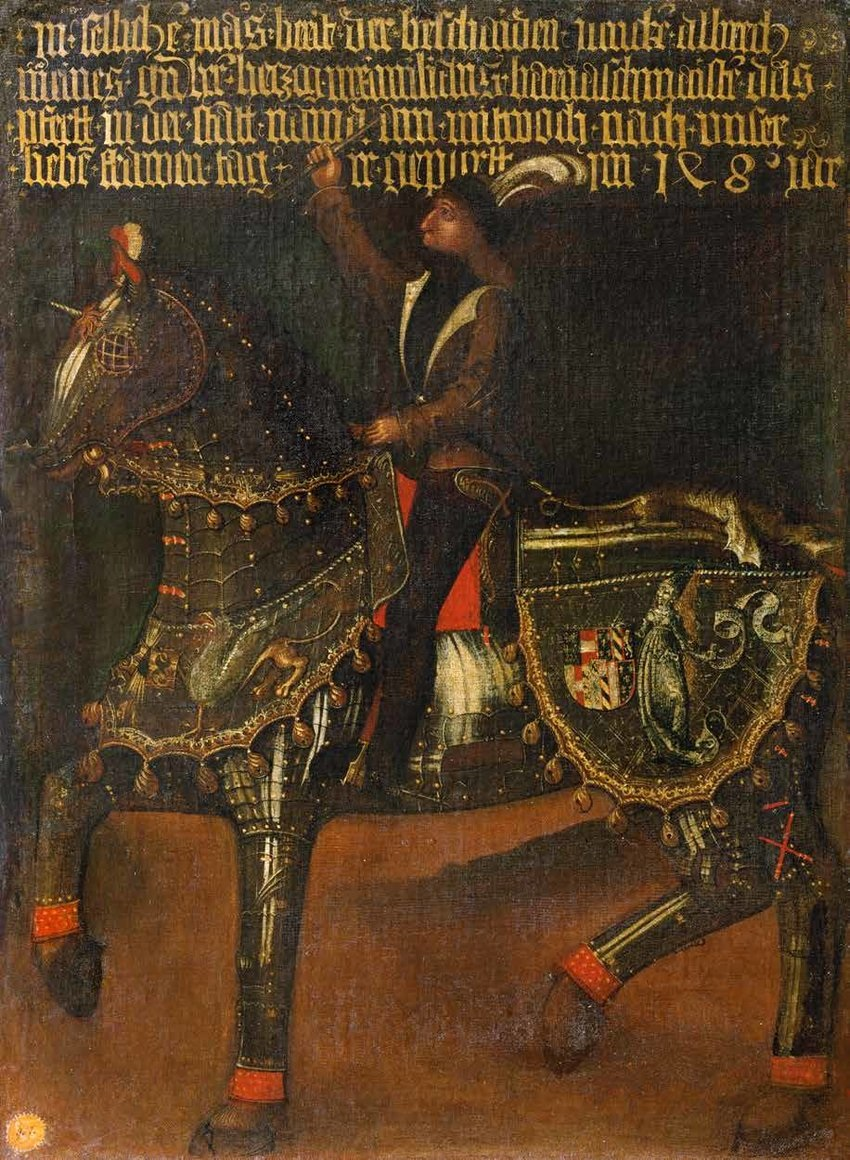
Albrecht May, Master-of-Arms, entering Namur, riding a horse wearing his master Maximilian I's bard in 1480. The bard is crafted by Lorenz Helmschmied. The female figure is likely Mary of Burgundy, the contemporary ruler of the Burgundian State and wife of Maximilian, holding the combined heraldry of Austria and Burgundy.

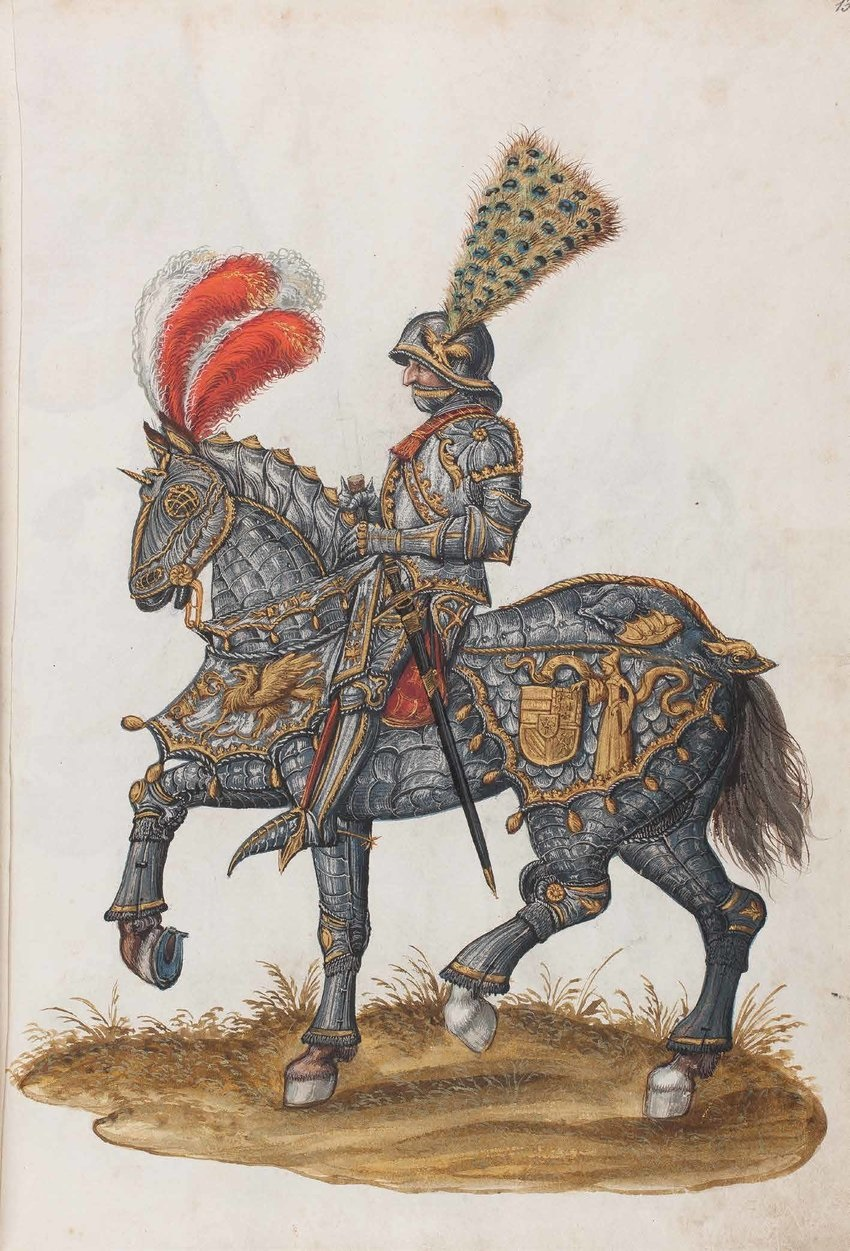
Maximilian I on an armored horse, ca. 1575, from Eine Reihe von in Farben zum Theil schön ausgeführten Bildern, Herzog August Bibliothek, Wolfenbüttel.

Notice the breastplate(s) with the griffin: according to Kirchhoff, this breastplate and the (double-headed) imperial eagle cruppers from the bard made for Frederick III above seemed to have been combined with other parts by Maximilian to create the full bard that he used in Strasbourg, 1492.

The full bard is a "complete ensemble of horse armour", created for Maximilian I, Holy Roman Emperor, by master armourers from Augsburg and Innsbruck like Lorenz Helmschmied and Konrad Seusenhofer. The development of the full bard was also connected with the development of Maximilian armour and the Landsknecht (all three arose from the time Maximilian was in Burgundian Netherlands), as both human and equine combatants required more and more protection. But the full bard was expensive and only the richest knights could afford it.

The celebrated Augsburg maker Lorenz Helmschmied made the most technologically developed and also the most complete of the full bards. According to Dirk H. Breiding, a former assistant curator for the Department of Arms and Armor of The Metropolitan Museum of Art, "the Helmschmid workshop also produced spectacular bards that all but completely enclosed the horse’s body, including the underside of the girth and abdomen, as well as the legs. Complete to the extreme, and of such technical complexity and considerable expense that they were most likely intended solely for ceremonial purposes and as diplomatic gifts.".

The extremely elaborated and innovative bards crafted by Lorenz Helmschmied were important as iconographic and propagandic devices for Maximilian in his Burgundian years, as the horse wearing his bards served as living banners for the master even when he could not be present himself. Maximilian utilized the technological expertise of Augsburg, renowned for its innovative wonders and automata, for his bards that, in combination with equine and human performances, would produce optical and technological marvels corresponding to the Burgundian entremets for the Burgundian viewers. Kirchhoff writes that, "In its most luxurious iterations, horse armor did far more than protect an expensive and extensively trained steed. It transformed the animal’s body into a moving sculpture and a communicative surface upon which to inscribe the iconography of power. In the case of the bard now in Vienna, the crupper plates that encase the horse’s flanks form imperial double eagles that are enlivened by etched feathers and emblazoned with an escutcheon bearing the arms of Austria. The corresponding crupper shown in images of the 1480 entries uses the marshalled heraldry of the Habsburg and Burgundian dynasties, supported by a figure that resembles the duchess herself, to declare the consolidation of Mary and Maximilian’s power [...] No surviving equine armor approaches the technical and visual ambition of the articulated bard, and the Helmschmids are the only armorers known to have created matrixes of steel plates flexible enough to encase a horse’s entire lower body as it moved. Indeed, this type of armor became associated with Maximilian, who continued to commission bards that covered horses’ legs and bellies to arm his own steeds and also as diplomatic gifts to forge alliances and demonstrate Habsburg power." The recipients of these bards included Sigismund I the Old, who was presented with "two coursers all covered with steel to the fetlocks and the belly, save in the spurring place". Another case was Henry VIII's so-called Burgundian bard.

When the parts are interchangeable, parts of different bards can be mixed to create a full bard. Maximilian seemed to have reattached this bard's imperial eagle cruppers from the bard made for Frederick III (and crafted by Helmschmìed and Seusenhofer, as shown in the image above) to parts from other bards for a procession in Strasbourg on 31 August 1492, described by the Venetian diplomat Andrea Franceschi as “horse armored from head to foot – an extremely glittering sight!”. According Franceschi's letter, "the animal’s breast was emblazoned with two griffins and on each of its flanks was the imperial eagle."

== Elements ==
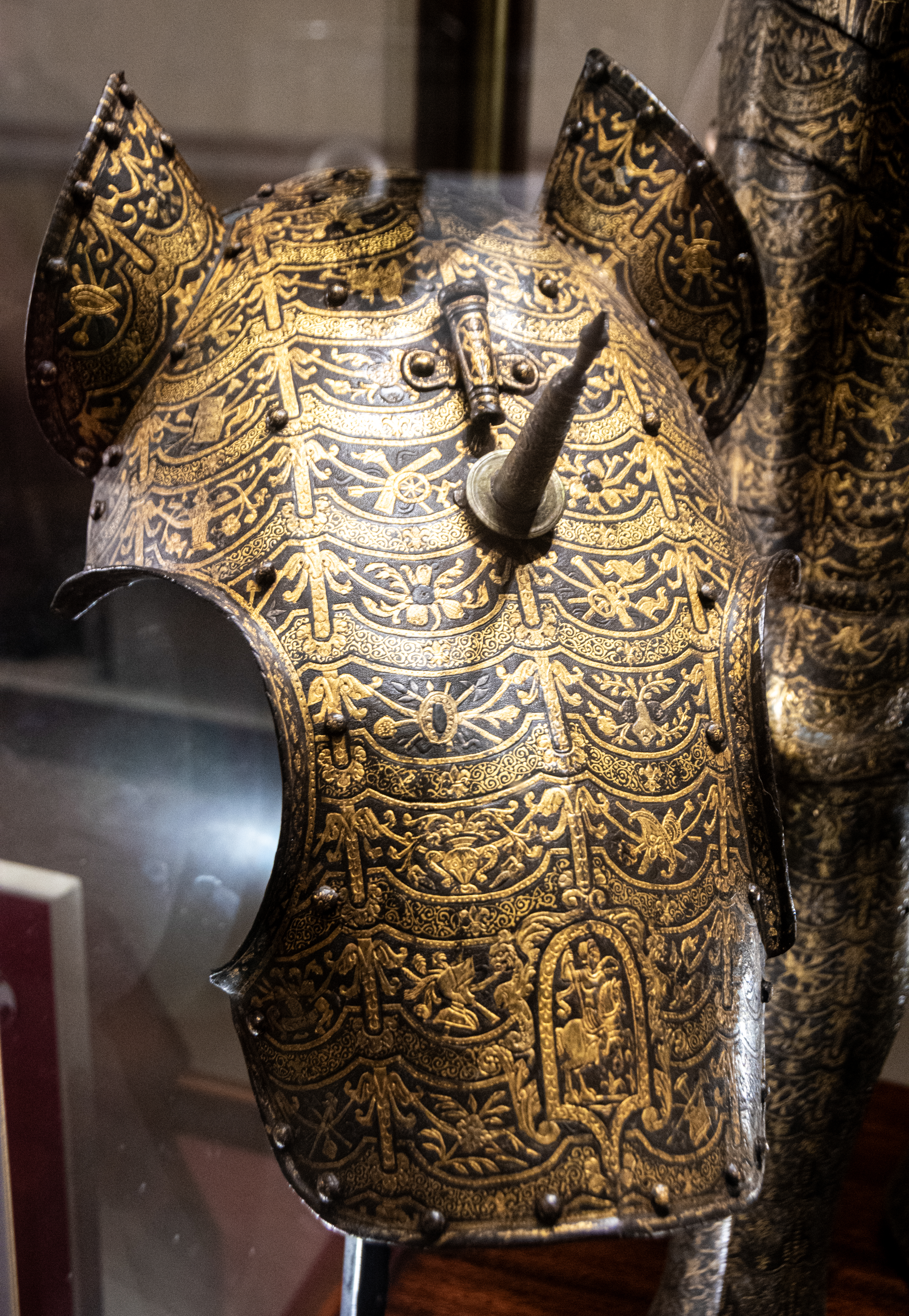
Milanese parade chanfron of Grandmaster Alof de Wignacourt, c. 1600, displayed at the Palace Armoury, Valletta, Malta

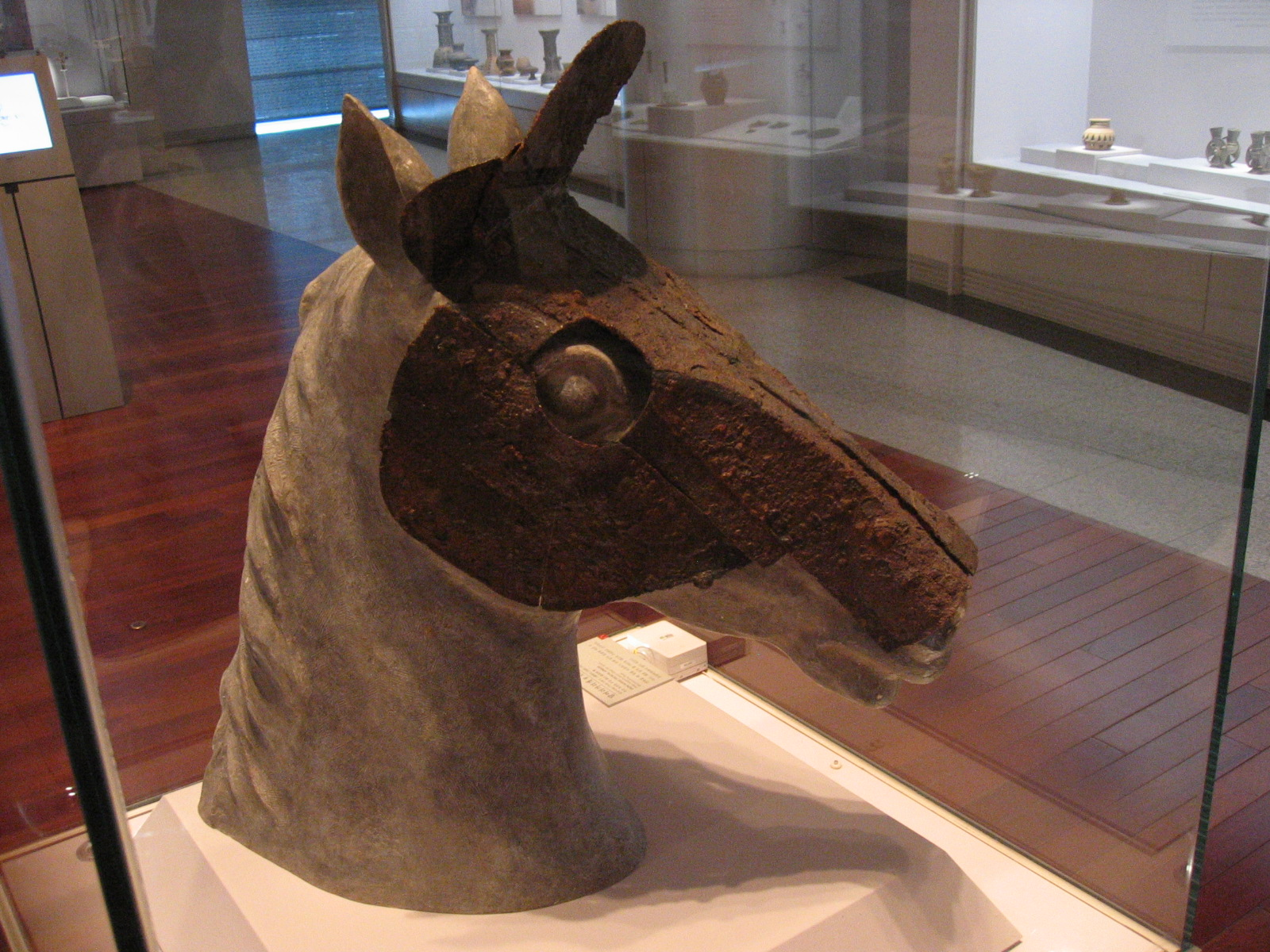
Chanfron, Gaya confederacy

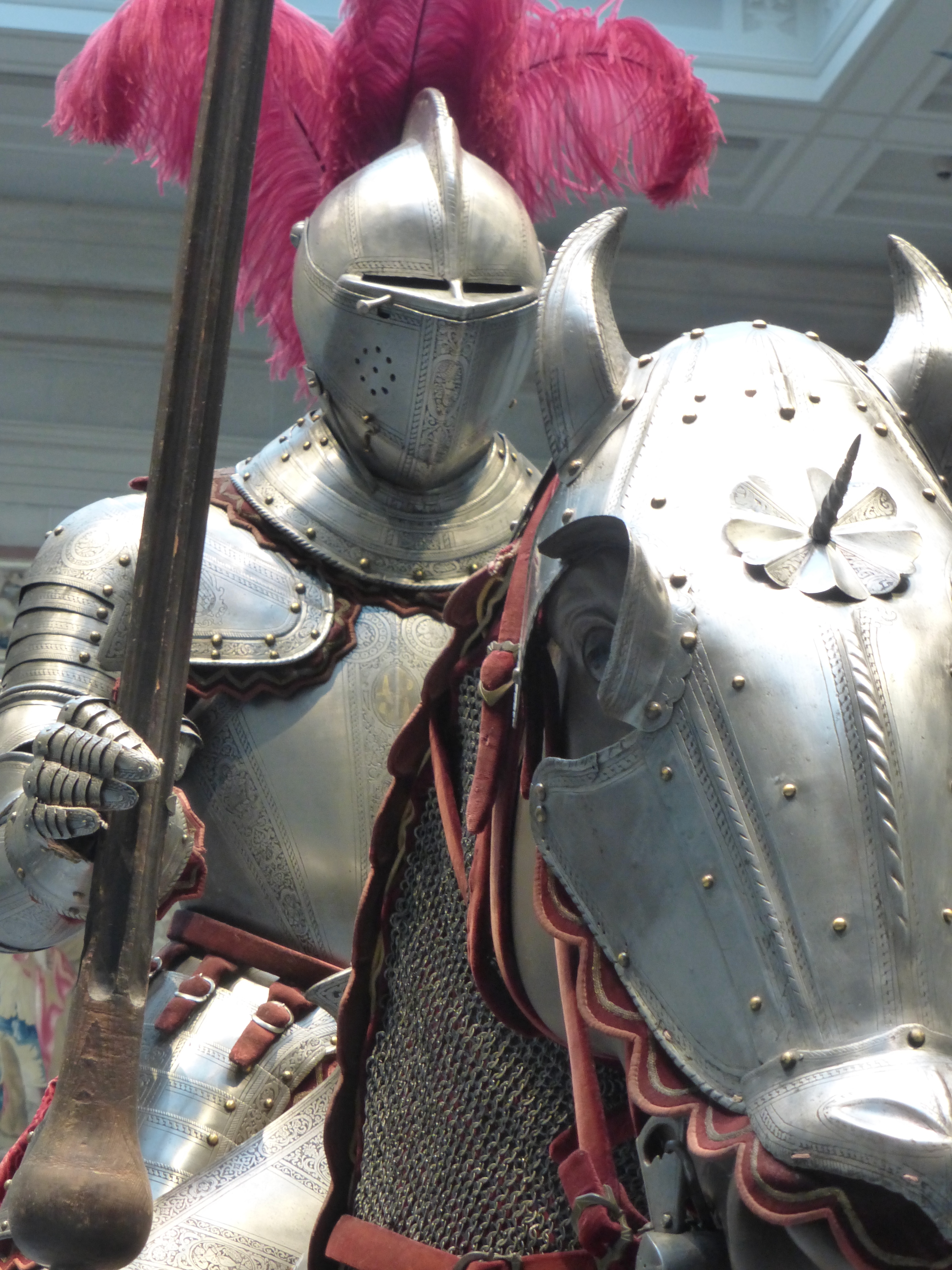
Renaissance Italian horse armor c. 1575, showing the chanfron protecting the horse's head, with small rondel and spike. Cleveland Museum of Art, Cleveland OH

The chanfron (also spelled chaffron, chamfron, champion, chamfron, chamfrein, champron, and shaffron) was designed to protect the horse's face. Sometimes this included hinged cheek plates. A decorative feature common to many chanfrons is a rondel with a small spike. The chanfron was known as early as ancient Greece, but vanished from use in Europe until the mid eleventh century when metal plates replaced boiled leather as protection for war horses. The basic design of the chanfron remained stable until it became obsolete in the seventeenth century, although late examples are often notable for engraved decoration. A chanfron extended from the horse's ears to its muzzle. Flanges often covered the eyes. In an open chanfron, the eyes received no protection. Hinged extensions to cover the jowls were commonly used for jousting tournaments. The enigmatic Torrs pony-cap from Scotland appears to be a bronze chanfron from about the 2nd century BC, perhaps later fitted with the bronze horns found with it.

The criniere (also known as manefaire or crinet) was a set of segmented plates that protected the horse's neck. In full barding this consisted of two combinations of articulated lames that pivoted on loose rivets. One set of lames covered the mane and the other covered the neck. These connected to the peytral and the chanfron. Light barding used only the upper lames. Three straps held the crinet in place around the neck. It is thought that thin metal was used for these plates, perhaps 0.8 mm. Mail armour was often affixed to the crinet and wrapped about the horse's neck for additional protection.

The croupiere (also crupiere bacul or crupper) protected the horse's hind quarters. It could be made from any combination of leather, mail, or plate armour.

The flanchards, used to protect the flank, attached to the side of the saddle, then around the front or rear of the horse and back to the saddle again. These appear to have been metal plates riveted to leather or in some cases cuir bouilli armour (which is boiled or treated leather sealed with beeswax or the like). They sometimes had openings designed to allow the rider to use spurs.

The peytral was designed to protect the chest of the horse, while the croupiere protected the rear. It sometimes stretched as far back as the saddle.

Barding was often used in conjunction with cloth covers known as caparisons. These coverings sometimes covered the entire horse from nose to tail and extended to the ground. It is unclear from period illustrations how much metal defensive covering was used in conjunction. Textile covers may also be called barding.

Another commonly included feature of barding was protection for the reins, so they could not be cut. This could be metal plates riveted to them or chainmail linked around them.

== Gallery ==
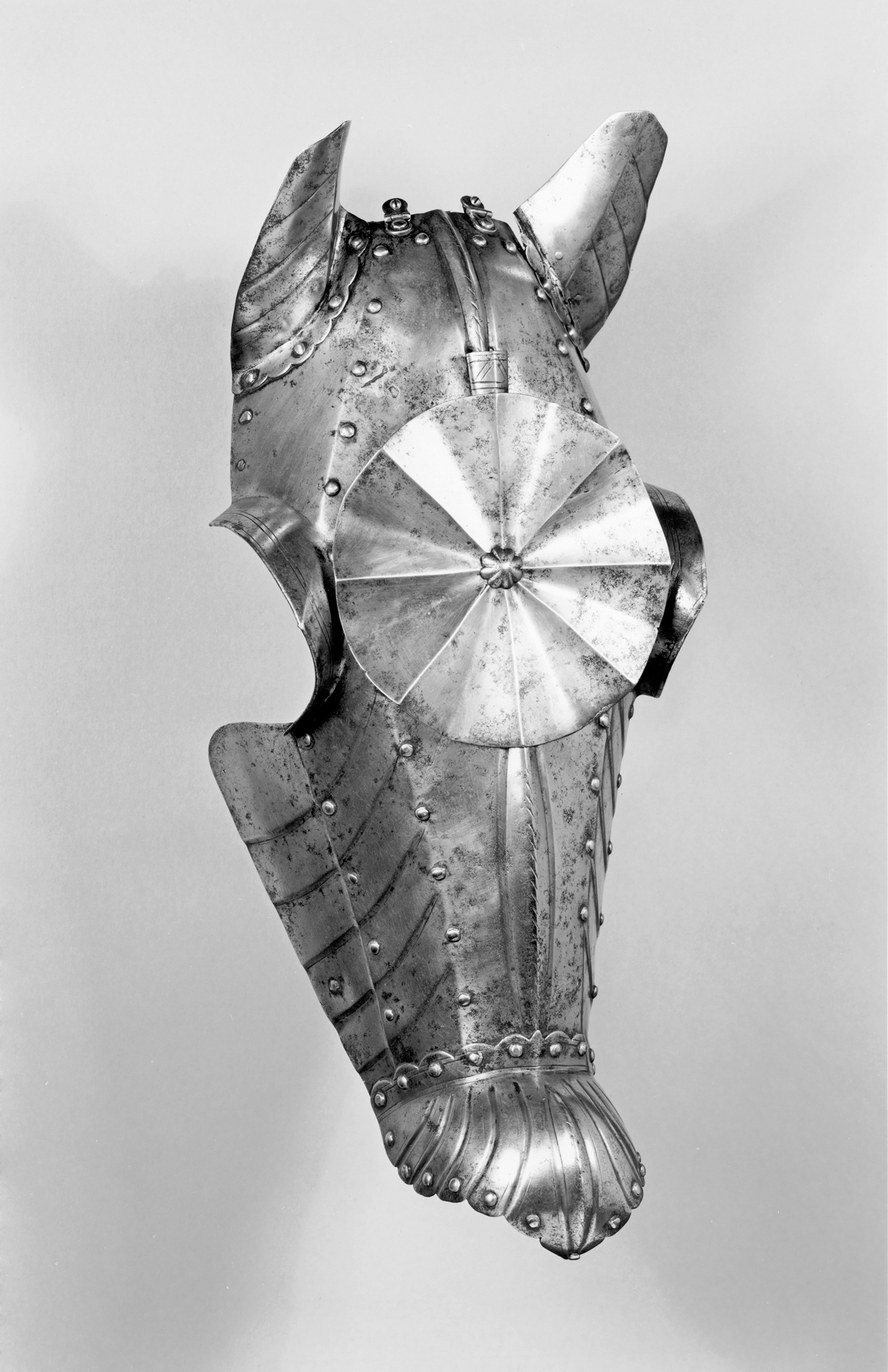
A chanfron made in Italy in the early 16th century

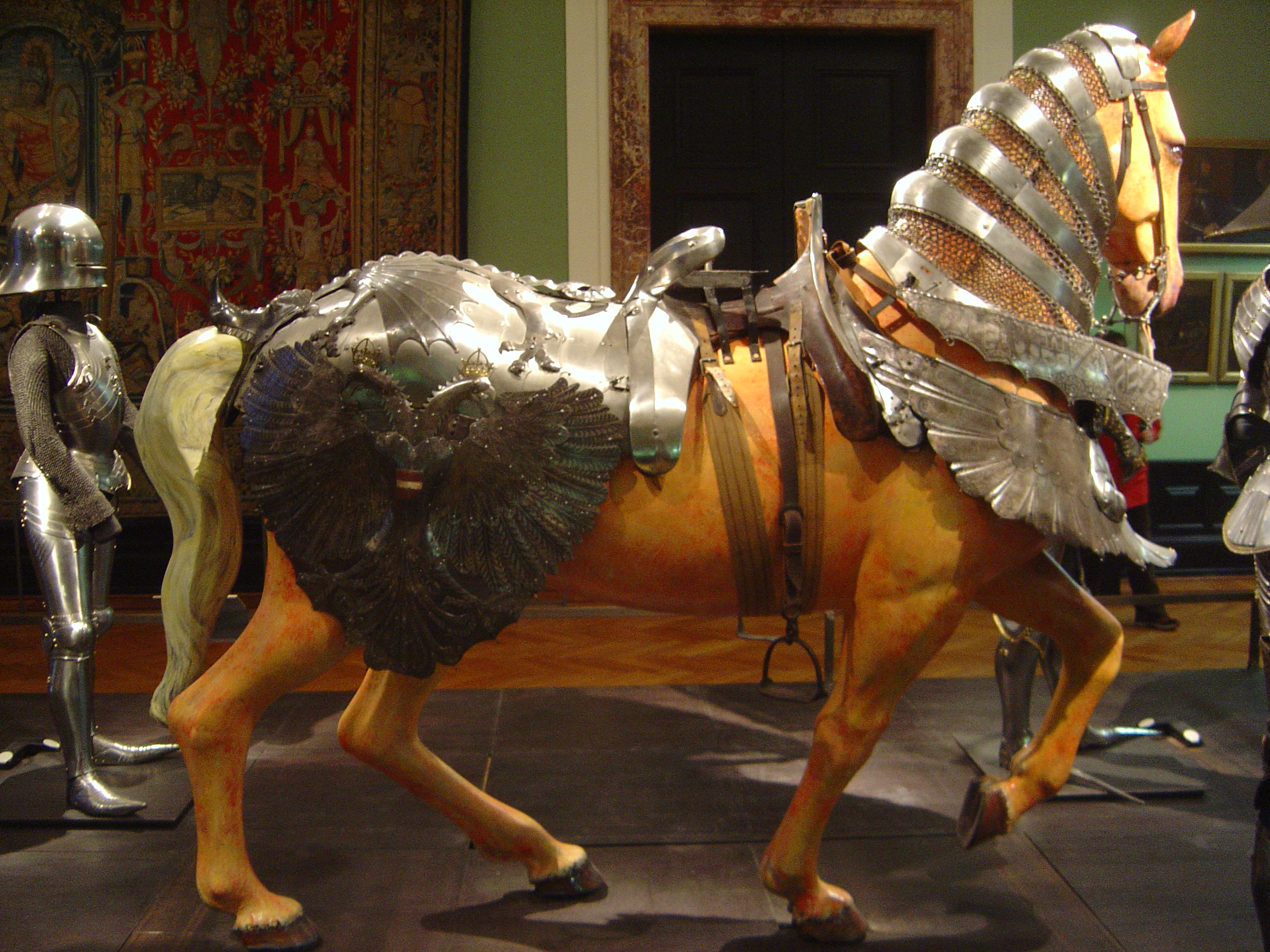
Fragments of a set of armour with a criniere (protecting neck), peytral (protecting chest) and the croupiere (protecting hind quarters). This set was created by Lorenz Helmschmied and Konrad Seusenhofer for Frederick III, Holy Roman Emperor and later also used by his son Maximilian I. Kunsthistorisches Museum, Vienna, Austria.

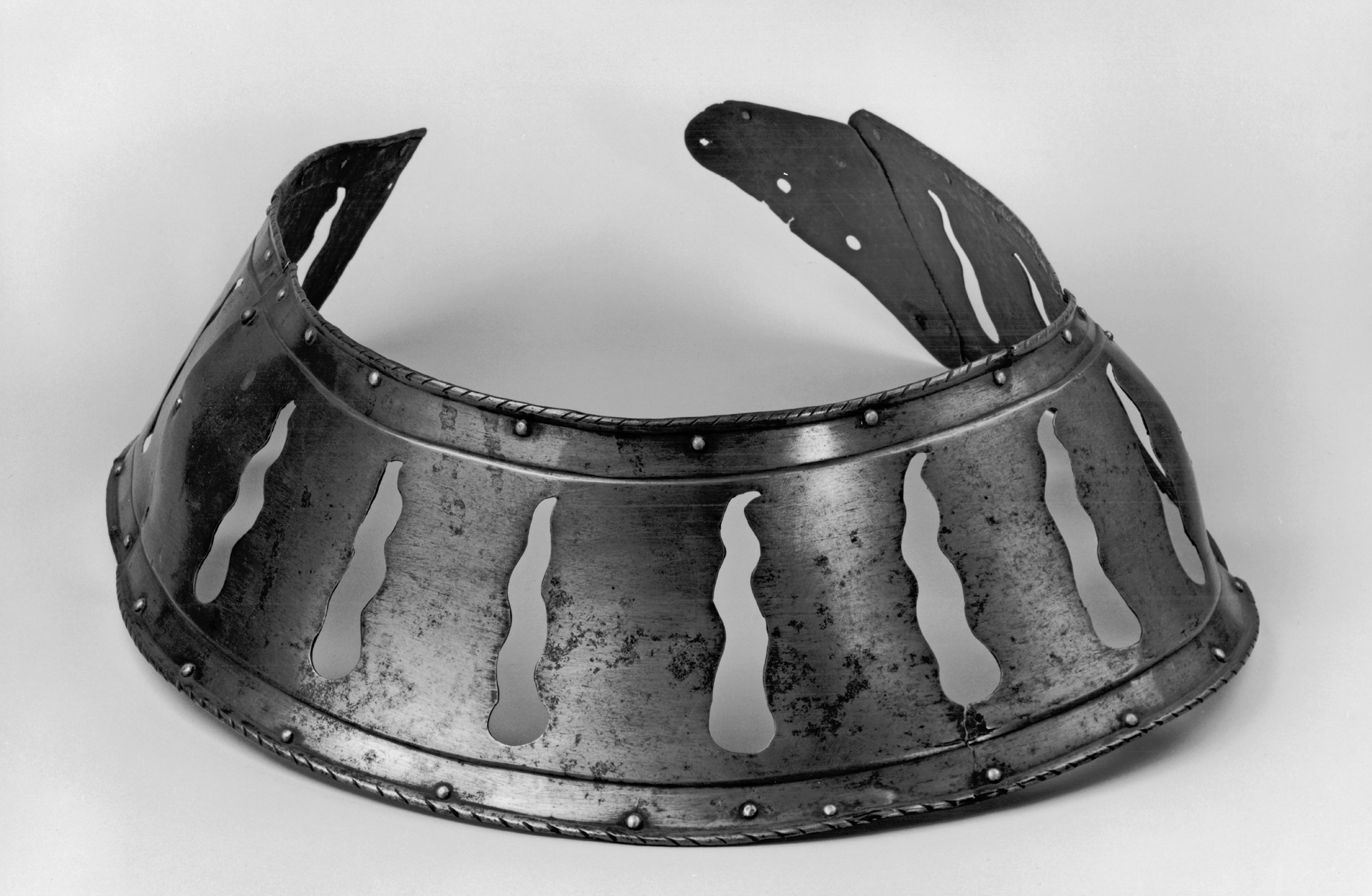
Peytral with decorative openings, early 16th century, Germany

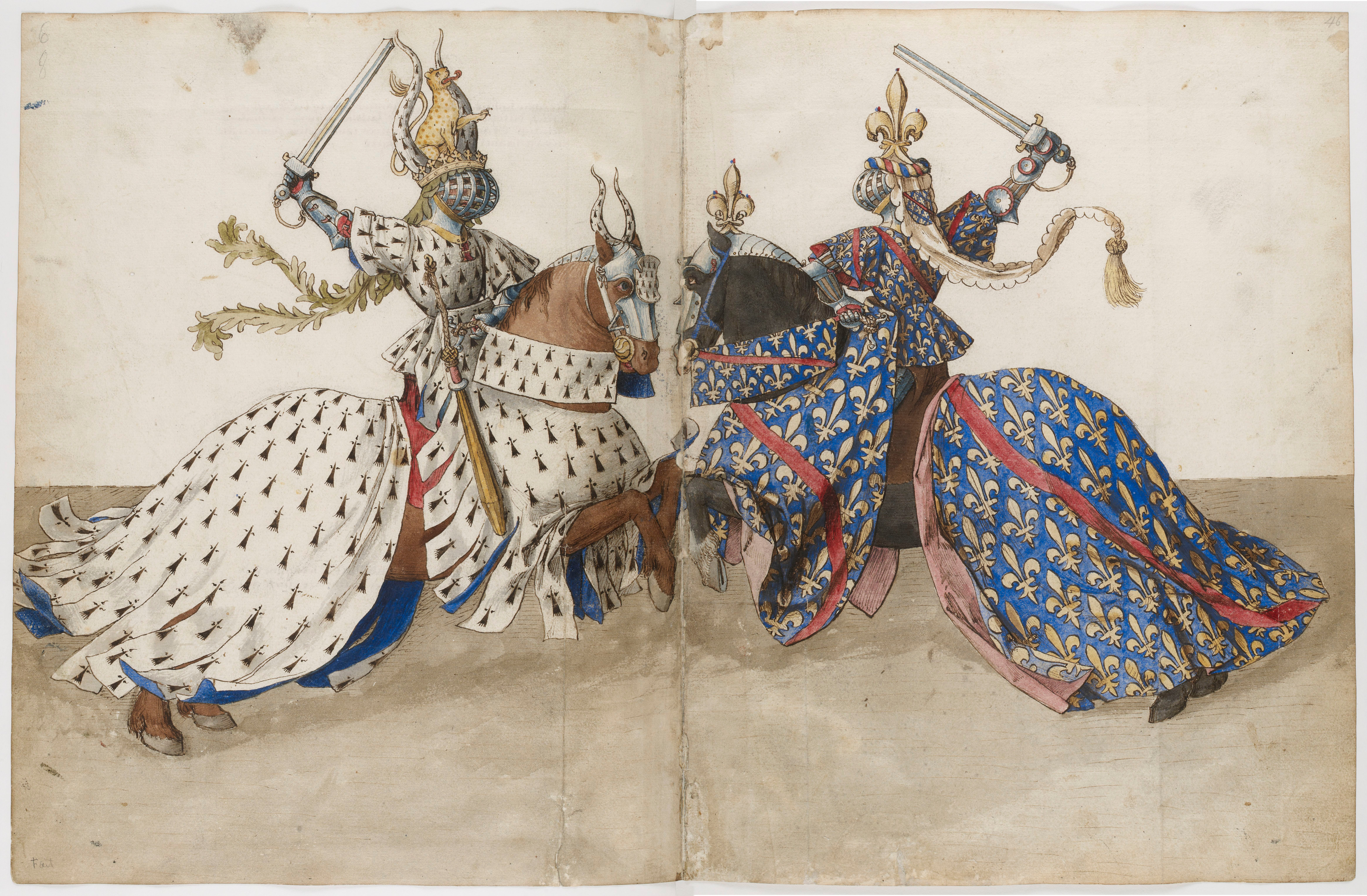
This 15th-century depiction of a tournament shows fully caparisoned horses, from Le Livre des tournois by Barthélemy d'Eyck.

== See also ==
- Horse leg protection
- Horse tack
- Horses in the Middle Ages
- Horses in warfare
- Destrier
- Courser (horse)
- War elephant
