= Missaglia (surname) =

Missaglia is an Italian surname. Notable people with the surname include:

- Antonio Missaglia (1416/1417–1495/1496), Italian armourer
- Ennio Missaglia (1930–1996), Italian cartoonist
- Gabriele Missaglia (born 1970), Italian cyclist
