= Armouries Square =

Public space in Leeds, England

Coordinates: 53.7914°N 1.5319°W

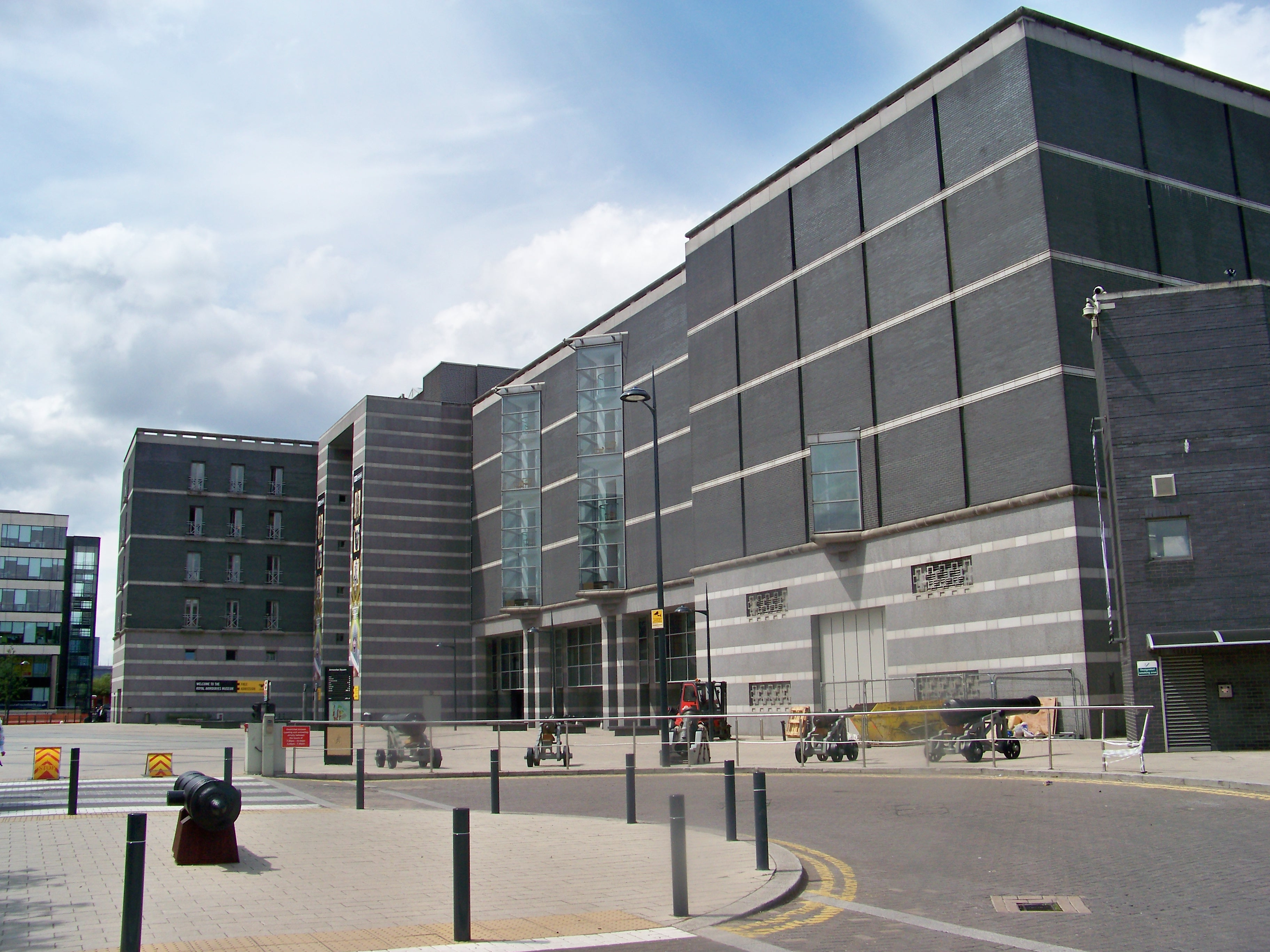
Armouries Square with the Royal Armouries Museum

Armouries Square is a large public square in central Leeds, West Yorkshire, United Kingdom, adjacent to the Royal Armouries Museum, after which it is named.

It was opened as part of a regeneration project which sought to update the area around Leeds Dock with the square being a hard-standing display area for displays by the Royal Armouries Museum.
