= Horned helmet of Henry VIII =

1514 metal helmet by Seusenhofer

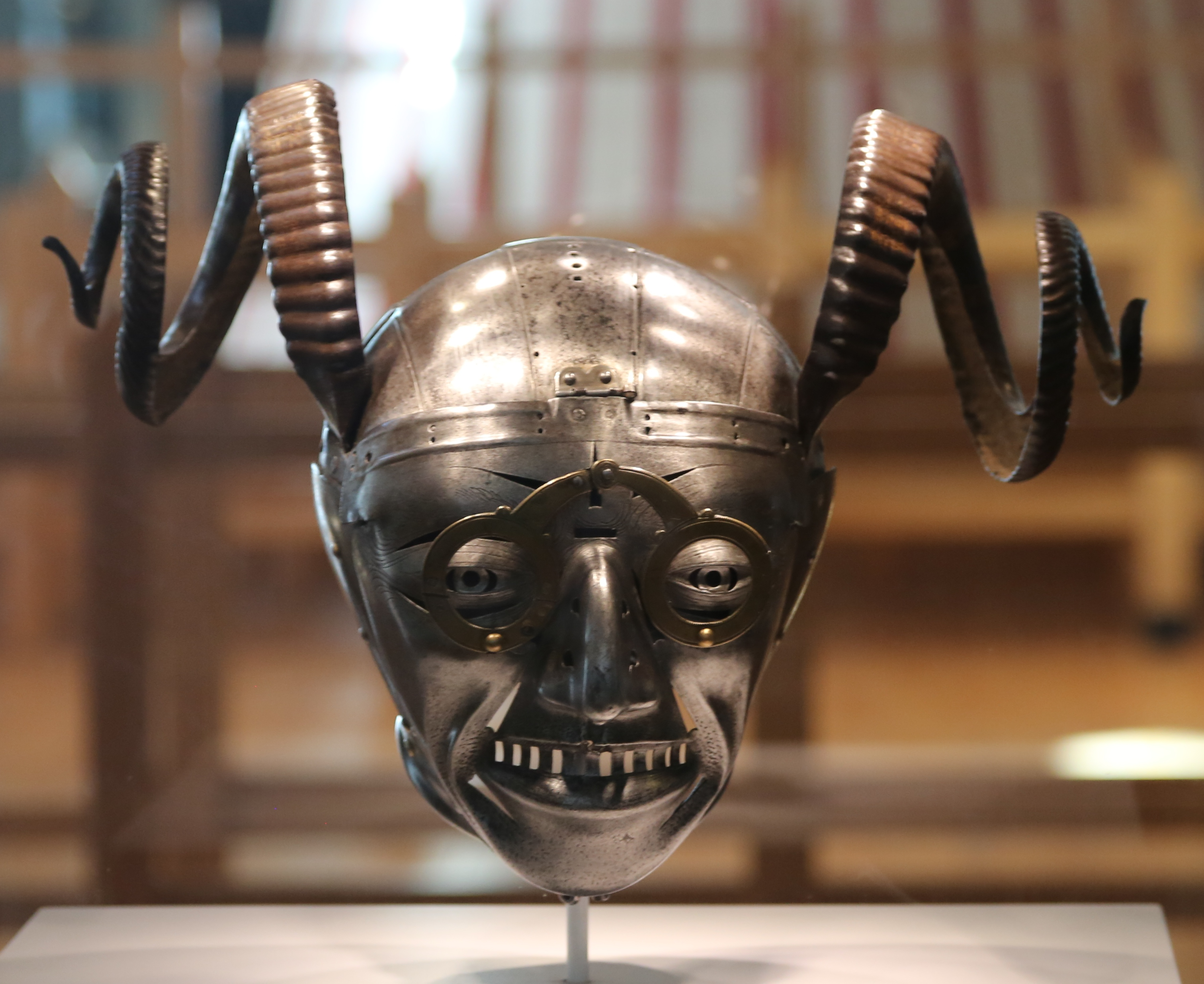
As currently displayed in the Royal Armouries, Leeds

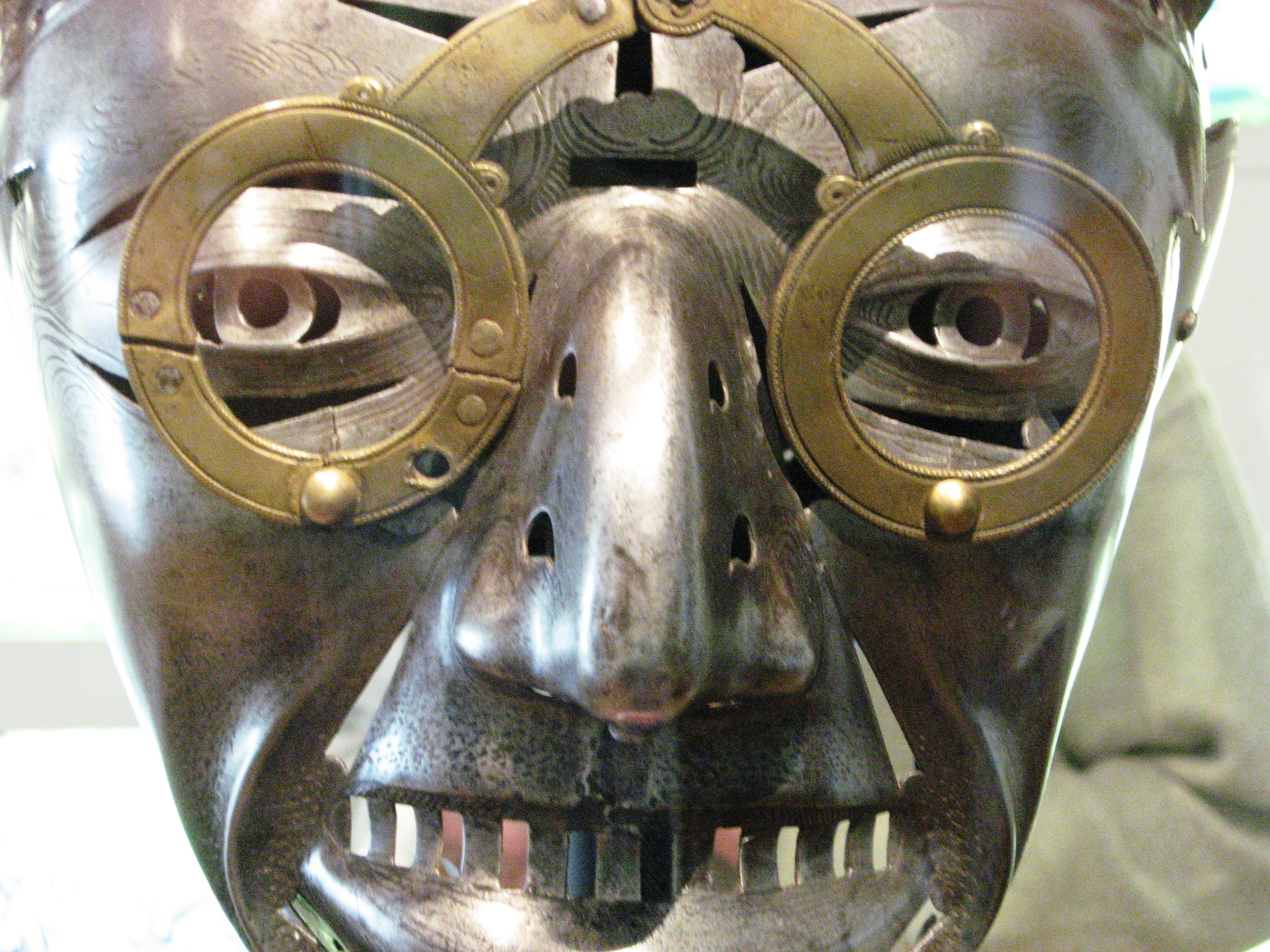
Detail of face

The horned helmet of Henry VIII (more properly called the parade armet) is the surviving part of a full suit of armour made by Konrad Seusenhofer between 1511 and 1514. The armour was a gift from the Holy Roman Emperor Maximilian I to the English king Henry VIII, following their alliance in the War of the League of Cambrai. The suit was elaborate and intended for display at tournament parades. It is unclear who was the intended wearer of the armour, but it appears to have been modelled on one of Henry's court fools. Henry may have worn the armour as a jest. The helmet has protruding eyes and a toothy grimace and is adorned with horns and spectacles. The helmet survived when the rest of the suit of armour was scrapped, probably after the English Civil War, and it is now in the collection of the Royal Armouries Museum in Leeds, which formerly used it as a symbol of the museum.

== Background ==
Although commonly known as the "horned helmet", the piece is an armet enclosing the entire head. It was commissioned, as part of a full suit of armour, by Maximilian I in 1511 as a gift for Henry VIII. Henry and Maximilian had recently forged an alliance, as part of the Holy League, in the War of the League of Cambrai against France. (The Holy Roman Empire had, until 1510, been on the French side.) In 1509, Henry had married Catherine of Aragon, whose sister, Joanna of Castile, was married to Maximilian's son Philip.

Maximilian ordered his court armourer Konrad Seusenhofer to produce the armour, although its engraving was carried out by an Augsburg goldsmith, and the suit was completed in 1514. The suit was delivered to Henry later that year, at the same time as another suit that he had commissioned was delivered. The suit was the second gift of armour made to Henry by Maximilian. The first had been a suit of tournament parade armour made in 1510 by Flemish armourer Guillem Margot. Maximilian had the gift embossed with devices of the House of Burgundy, which Maximilian had joined through his wife Mary of Burgundy, and the pomegranate device of Catherine.

== Description ==
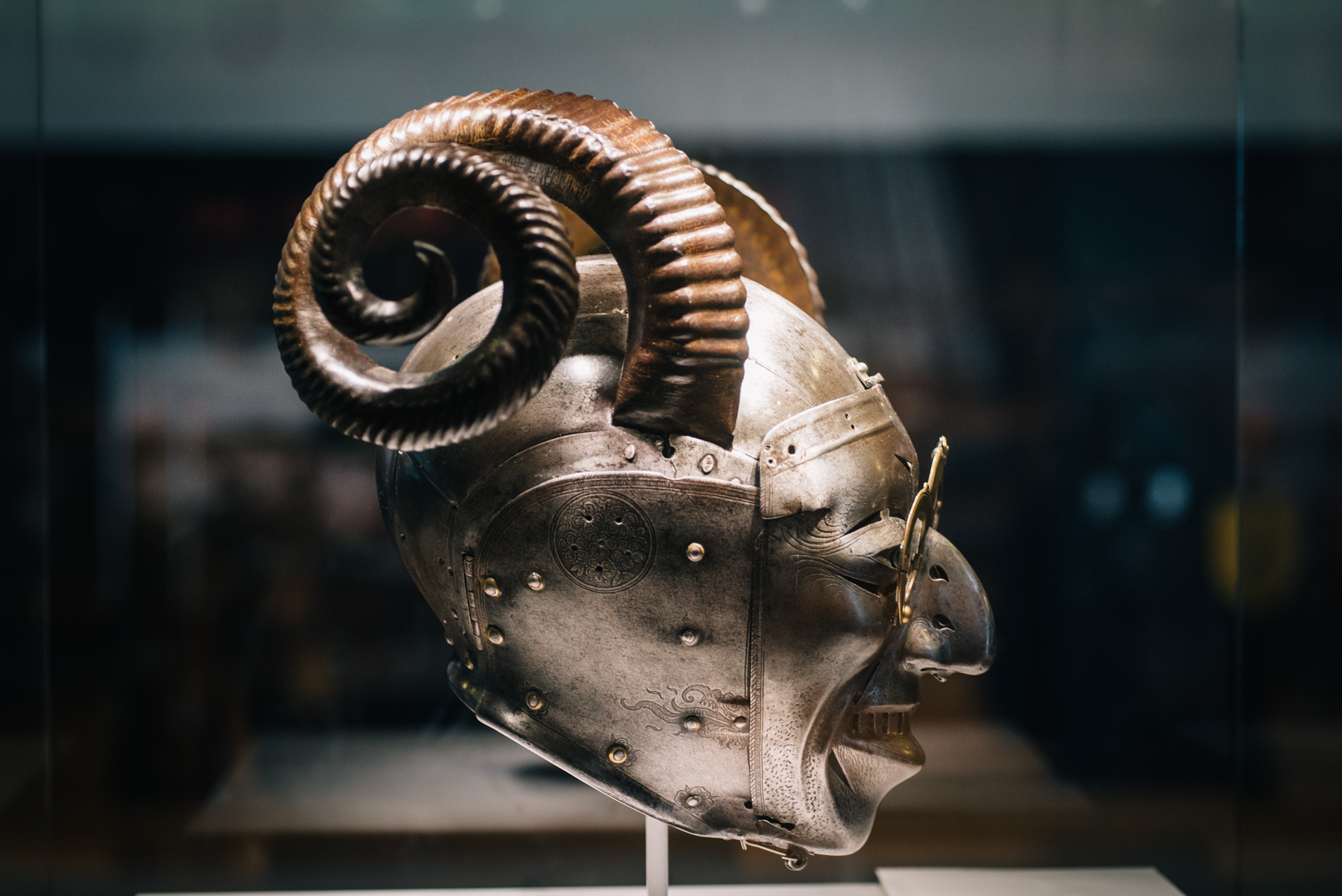
Right hand side of helmet

The suit of armour was elaborate, intended for display purposes at tournament parades. Its design was inspired by intricate fabrics, which may have been worn alongside the armour. It is possible that the armour was designed to include interchangeable pieces to be swapped to suit different forms of tournament contests. The entire suit was put on display after Henry's death, but today only the helmet survives. The rest of the armour is presumed to have been sold for scrap after the English Civil War; it is thought that the helmet was saved from this fate on account of its bizarre appearance.

The helmet includes a face piece with protruding eyes, a toothy grimace and a stubbly chin. The face includes fine detail such as crow's feet around the eyes and a drip beneath the nose. Ram's horns, made from sheet iron, are rivetted to the upper part of the helmet. The helmet has hinged cheekpieces, with rosette decoration around the ear holes. The face of the helmet has a pair of copper-alloy spectacles. It is not known if these were original to the helmet, but they date from before 1547. The spectacles are of the hinged type, known in Europe since the mid-14th century. The spectacles may have originally been gilded and are non-functional, not being fitted for lenses.

== Use ==
It is unclear if the armour was intended to be worn by Henry or another. During the 16th century horns were associated with cuckolds or the devil, rendering the armour unsuitable for a royal person, but it might have been worn by Henry as a jest. The armour was used primarily during court pageants.

The appearance of the helmet is likely to have been modelled on one of Henry's court fools. During the 17th century the helmet was displayed at the Tower of London and attributed to Will Sommers, one of Henry's fools, but he did not join the royal court until 1525.

Its possible that the horns are not original to the helmet. The design of the mask closely matches a face found on a playing card dating from the 1st half of the 16th century. The character is known as Schellenunter or Knave of Bells and does not have horns. The quality of the workmanship appears lower than the rest of the work on the helmet. They do however appear to have been fitted before 1547.

The helmet is currently in the collection of the Royal Armouries Museum in Leeds, and has been adopted as the symbol of the museum.
