= Lorenz Helmschmied =

German armourer, active 1467-1515

- Born: circa 1450
- Died: 1515; Augsburg

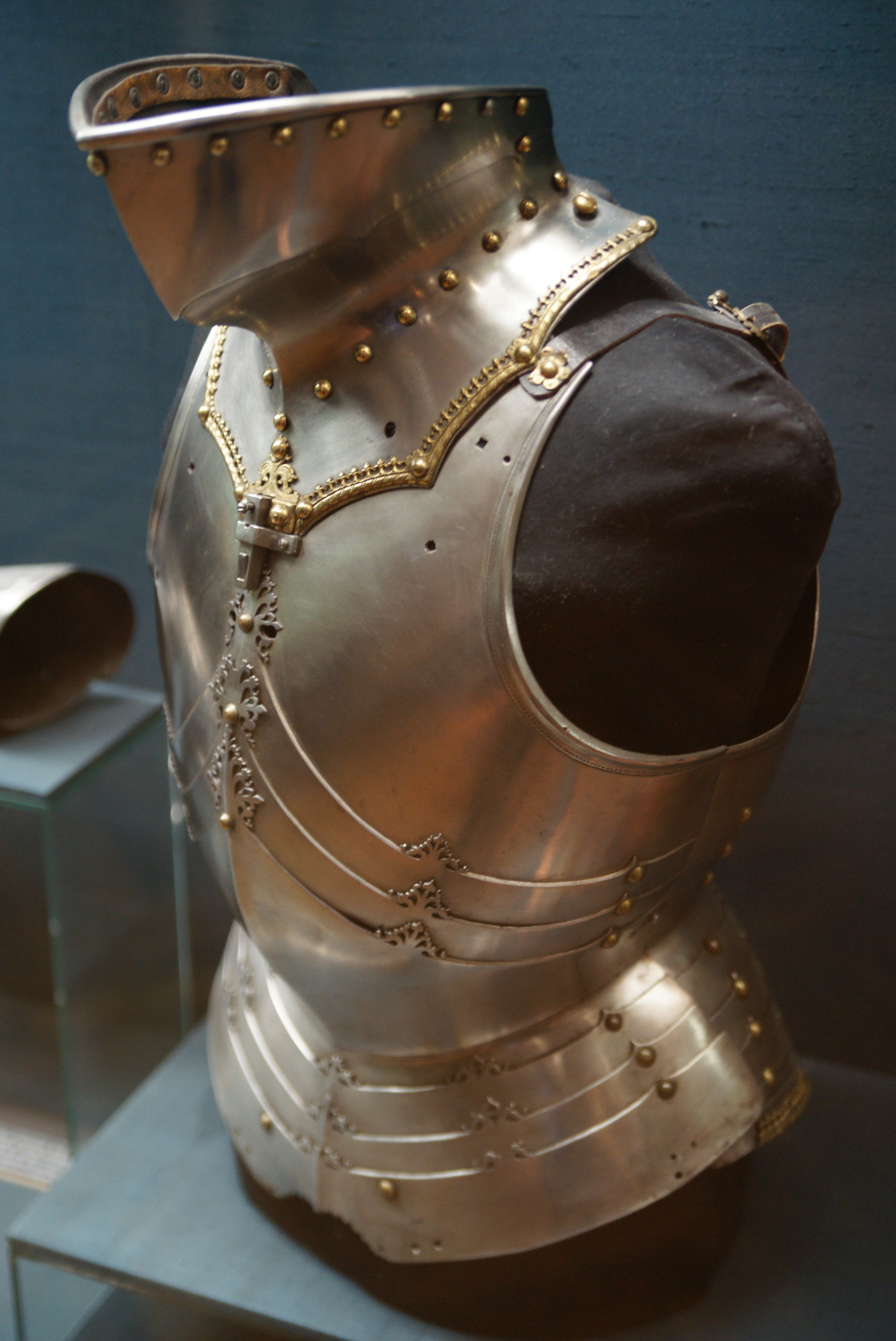
HJRK A 79 - Armour of Maximilian I, c. 1485

Lorenz Helmschmied or "Helmschmid" (active 1467–1515) was a German armourer and a member of the Helmschmied family of armourers from Augsburg. He was one of the primary armourers to the Habsburg court of the Holy Roman Emperors Frederick III and Maximilian I, and created some of the most technically innovative and artistically complex armours of the late-fifteenth and early-sixteenth centuries.

Lorenz was the son of the armourer Jörg Helmschmied, who was active in Augsburg from 1439. His brother, Jörg Helmschmied the Younger, was also a talented armourer active first in Augsburg, then in Vienna. Lorenz is documented as an apprentice armourer from 1469, and as a master in his own right from 1477. In that year, the Augsburg city tax records first alluded to his creation of expensive armours for the Holy Roman Emperor Frederick III. During the 1480s, Lorenz created spectacular garnitures, or matching sets, of armour for Frederick and especially for his son, the future Holy Roman Emperor Maximilian I. In February, 1480, then-Archduke Maximilian summoned the armourer to Ghent to serve him during his military campaigns in the Burgundian Netherlands; he remained in the Low Countries until May, 1481, and is mentioned in the Burgundian court records as "Leurens de Helmestede armurier demeurant en la ville de Hapsburg en Allemaigne." One of the garnitures that Lorenz created for Maximilian during this period is preserved in the Kunsthistorisches Museum in Vienna, and another may be the elegant example of the attenuated "late-gothic" style of armour that is now in the collection of the Detroit Institute of Arts. In 1491, Lorenz was officially invested with the title and privileges of court armourer, which he held for the rest of his life alongside the Innsbruck armourer, Konrad Seusenhofer. Many of the exceptional armours created by the Helmschmied workshop during Lorenz's lifetime, which include protections for both man and horse as well as specialized types of plate for tournament and field combat, remained in Habsburg imperial armouries and can be seen today in the Kunsthistorisches Museum in Vienna and the Royal Armoury of Madrid. Armours for the Joust of war are on display at Archduke Ferdinand II’s Armoury of Ambras Castle in Innsbruck, Tyrol.

Lorenz's son, Kolman Helmschmied, worked alongside him from 1492, and took control of the Helmschmied workshop after his father's death in 1515. Lorenz's grandson, Desiderius Kolman Helmschmied was also an important armourer to aristocratic patrons throughout Europe into the late-sixteenth century.
