= Royal Armouries Museum =

Museum in Leeds, West Yorkshire, England

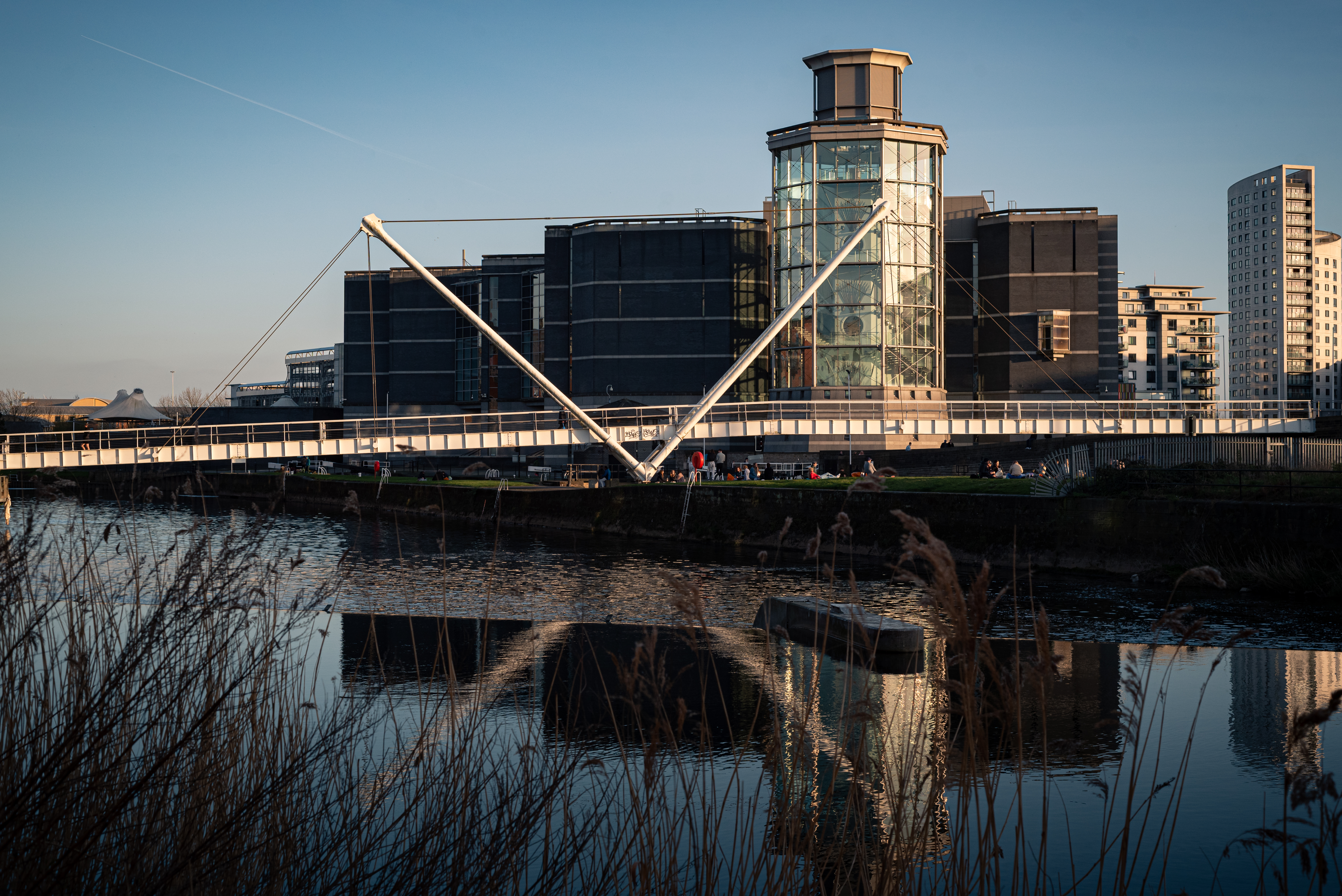
- The Royal Armouries Museum and Knight's Way Bridge

- Location within Leeds
- Established: 1996; 30 years ago
- Location: Leeds Dock, Leeds, LS10; England
- Coordinates: 53.79194444°N 1.53250000°W
- Type: National museum
- Visitors: 240,000 (2019)
- Director: Nat Edwards
- Public transit access: Leeds railway station; 29 to Chadwick Street (stop A1); 167 to Black Bull Street (stop A5); Leeds Water Taxi
- Website: royalarmouries.org

The Royal Armouries Museum in Leeds, West Yorkshire, England, is a national museum that holds the National Collection of Arms and Armour. It is part of the Royal Armouries family of museums, with other sites at the Royal Armouries' traditional home in the Tower of London, and the National Collection of Artillery at Fort Nelson, Hampshire. The Royal Armouries is a non-departmental public body sponsored by the Department for Culture, Media and Sport.

The Royal Armouries Museum is a £42.5 million purpose-built museum located in Leeds Dock that opened in 1996. Its collection was previously on display or in storage at the Tower of London where the Royal Armouries still maintains a presence and displays in the White Tower.

As at all UK National Museums, entry is free, though certain extra attractions are charged for.

== Construction ==
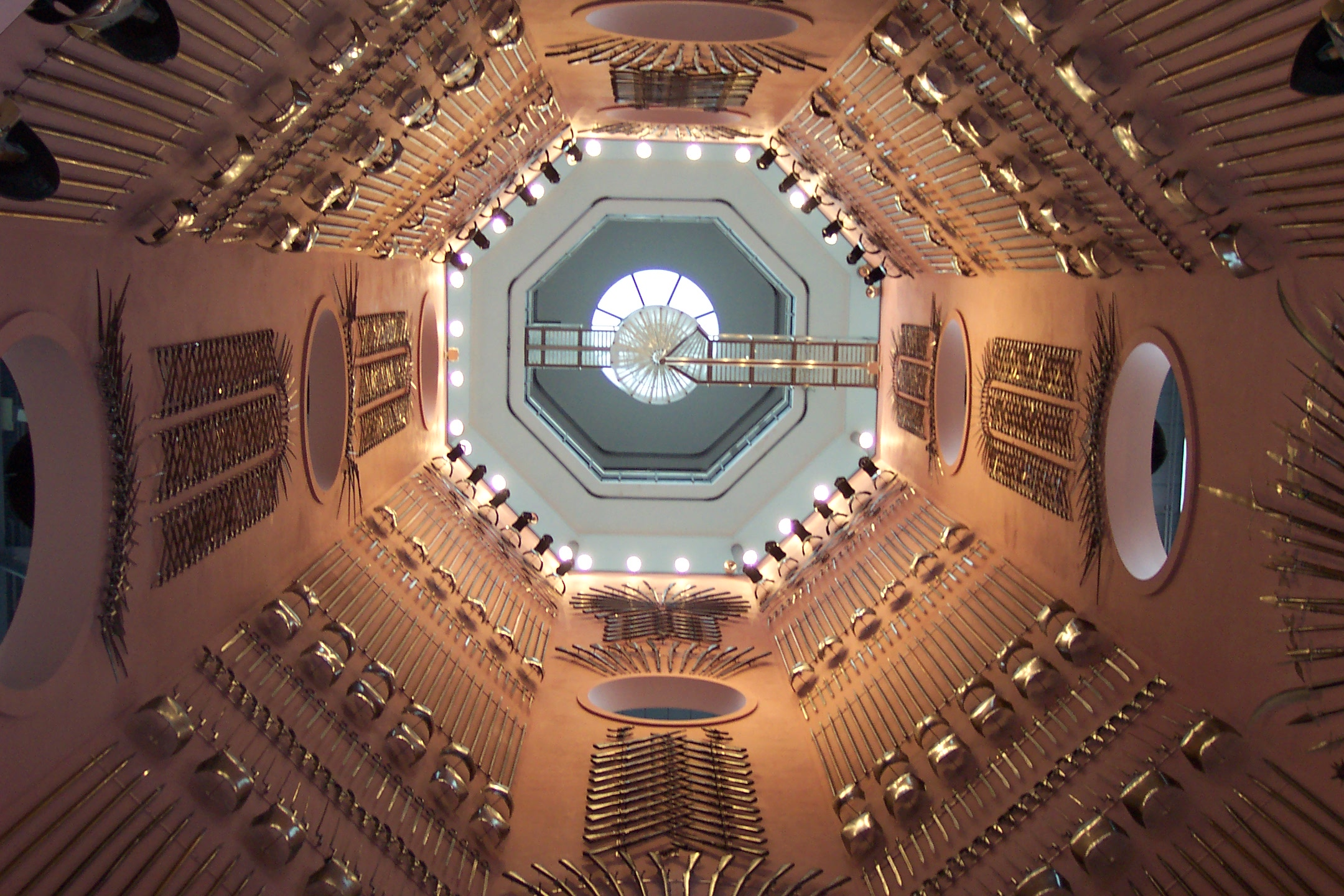
Royal Armouries Museum, Leeds: Looking up the main stairwell in the Hall of Steel

The museum was one of the first projects carried out under the UK private finance initiative: a non-departmental public body, the Royal Armouries, contracted with a private sector company, Royal Armouries International (RAI), which would build and then operate the museum for 60 years in return for the ticket revenue. The deal was financed by a long-term bank loan from Bank of Scotland, and £28.5m in grant support from the UK Government, Leeds Development Corporation and Leeds City Council, together with equity investment from 3i, Gardner Merchant, Electra and Yorkshire Electricity. RAI commissioned a new building to accommodate the museum: it was designed by Derek Walker and Buro Happold, and built by Alfred McAlpine at a cost of £42.5 million and was officially opened by Queen Elizabeth II in March 1996.

Visitor numbers were 324,000 in 1998 and 191,000 in 1997, far below projections. By 1999, the museum had accumulated debts of £20m and was facing closure; the Royal Armouries subsequently renegotiated its arrangement with RAI, taking over operation of the majority of the museum. In 2012, the Public Accounts Committee stated "[t]he handling of this was weak and commercially naive", while the National Audit Office reported "The end result is that the government, and not the contractor, will pay to keep this museum open."

== Location ==
Situated close to Leeds city centre on the South bank of the River Aire the museum is one of the focal points of the regenerated Leeds waterfront. It is located on Armouries Square, in Leeds Dock. Road access is by Armouries Drive and Chadwick Street.

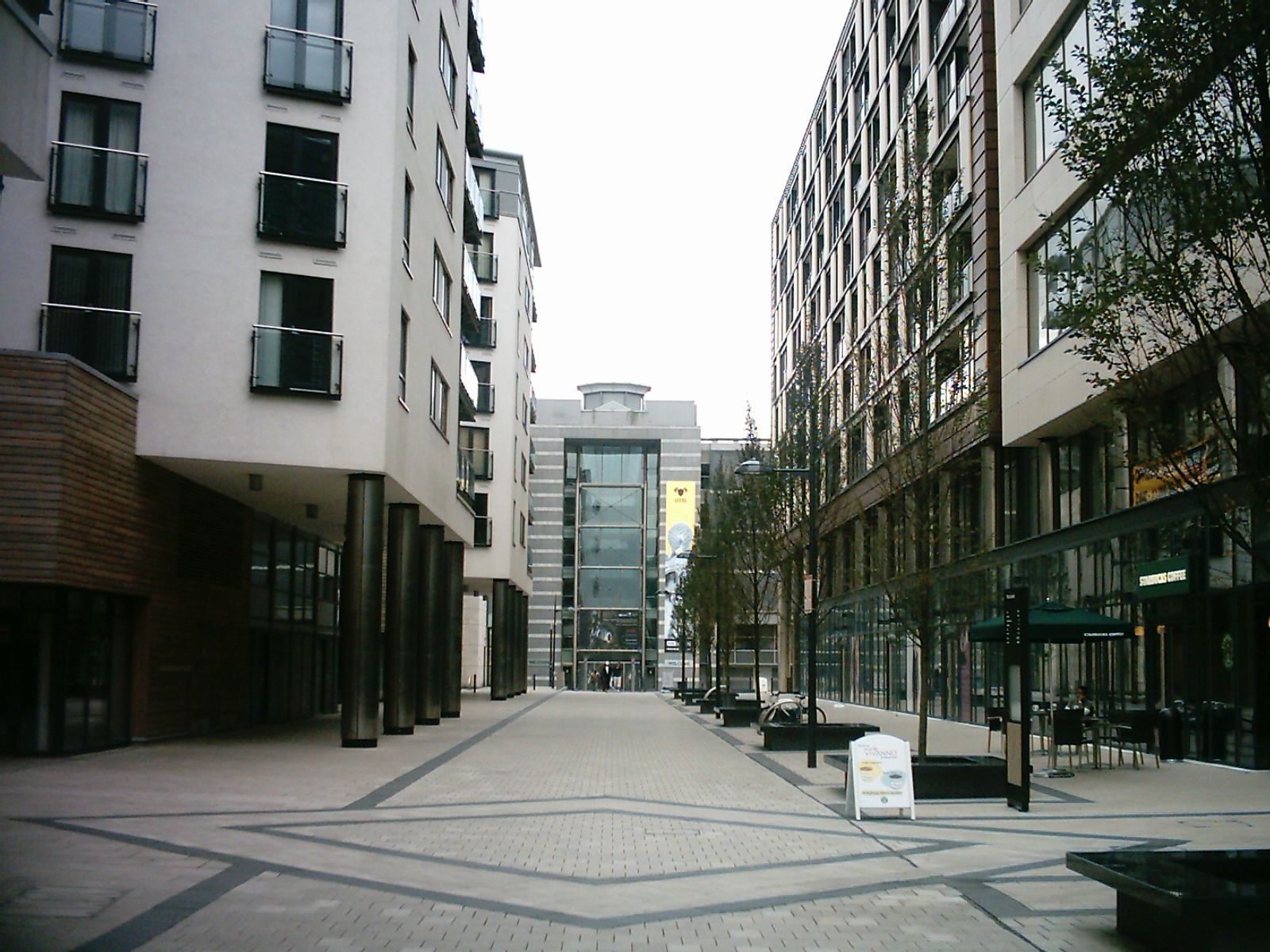
The Boulevard at Clarence Dock, looking towards the Royal Armouries Museum

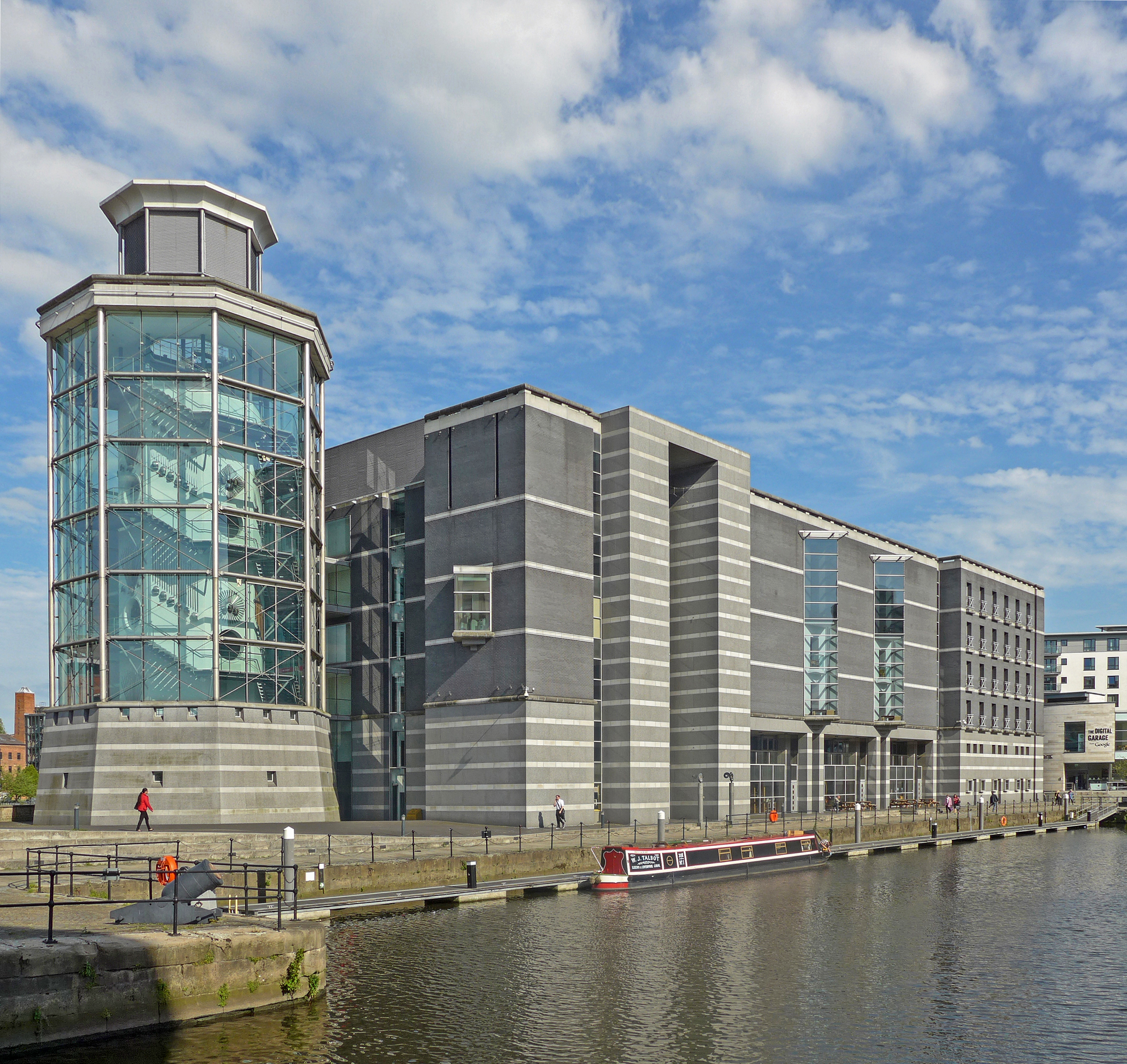
The north end of the museum featuring the Hall of Steel

== Features ==
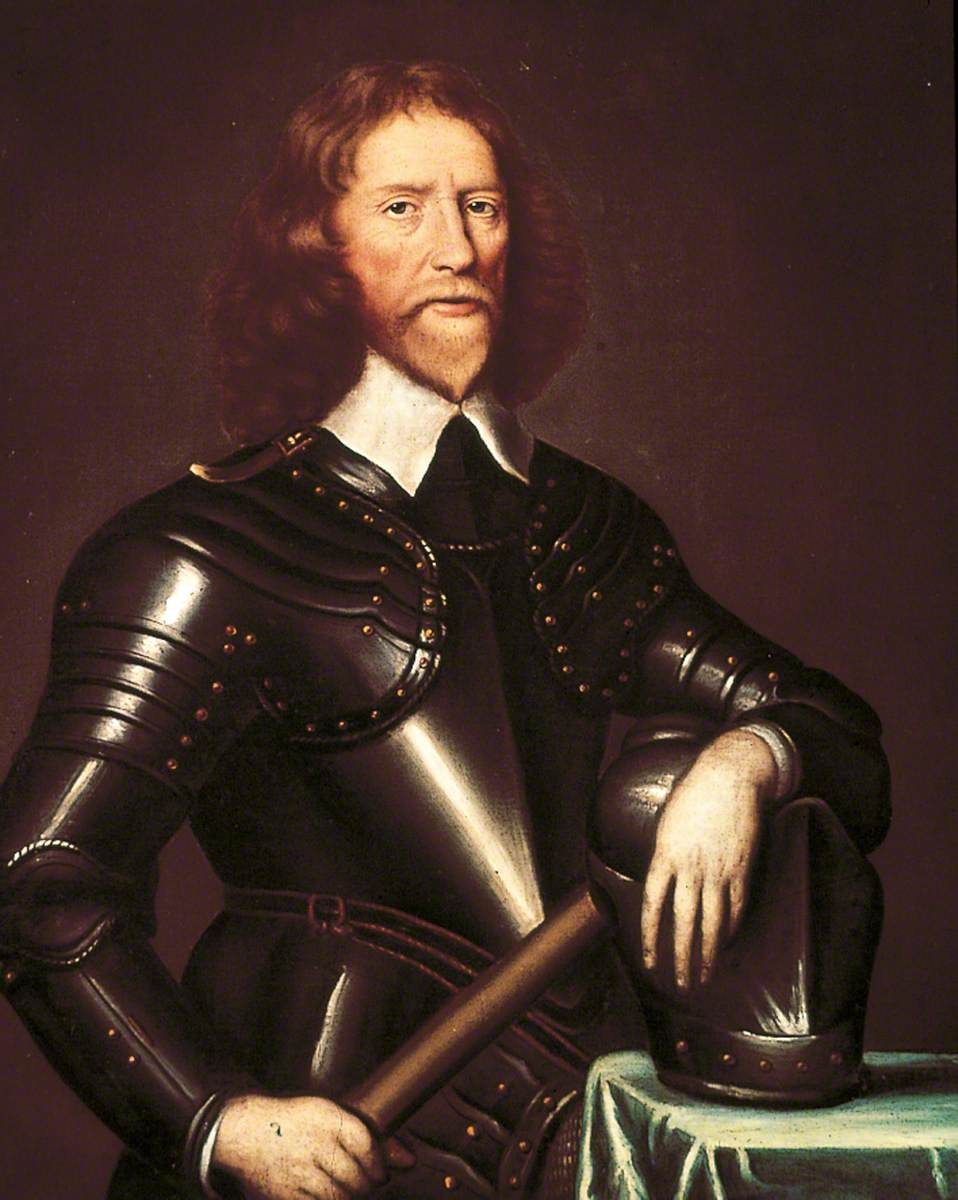
Sir Francis Wortley, 1st Baronet (1591–1652)

=== Main building ===
The Royal Armouries Museum itself was designed from the inside out. The ceiling heights of the new building were designed to accommodate the longest staff weapons in the collections, displayed vertically, and are 6.5 meters off the ground at their highest point.

In addition to the five original galleries which house 5,000 objects in the permanent displays and the Peace Gallery, the museum also includes the Hall of Steel, a giant staircase whose walls are decorated with trophy displays composed of 2,500 objects reminiscent of the historical trophy displays erected by the Tower Armouries from the 17th century.

The main entrance to the museum is accessed from Armouries Square.

==== War ====
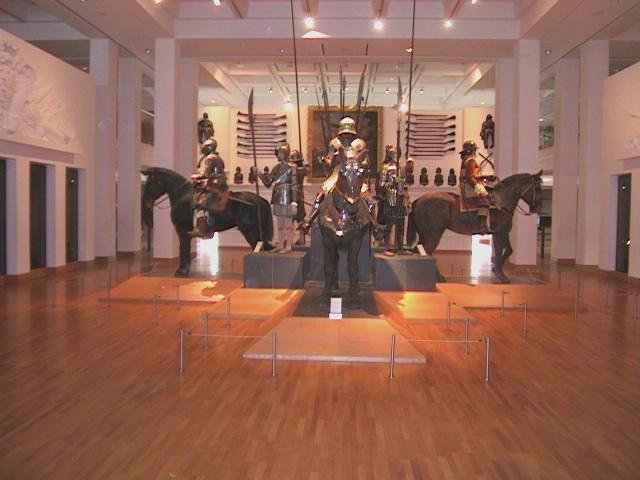
War Gallery

With displays dedicated to:

- Ancient and Medieval warfare
- 17th and 18th centuries
- 19th and 20th centuries

==== Peace – farewell to arms? ====
This gallery can be found within the War Gallery and looks at the potential for a future free of arms, looking at disarmament and concepts such as détente. This gallery is in partnership with the Peace Museum in nearby Bradford.

==== Africa & Asia ====
A gallery with displays dedicated to:

- South and South-east Asia
- China and Japan
- Central Asia, Islam and India

==== Tournament ====
A large gallery on two floors shows a variety of arms and armour from the sport of jousting.

==== Self defence ====
This gallery has a number of different displays dedicated to:

- Arms and armour as art
- The armed civilian
- Make: Believe – an exhibition celebrating the impact of arms and armour in popular culture, and of popular culture's impact on the design and development of arms and armour.

==== Tiltyard ====
Running alongside the River Aire for 490 feet (150 m), with seating on the land-ward side, is the Jousting Arena: though the museum no longer has its own horses, two important jousting contests each year are still held with competitors from all over the world. Easter is the height of the jousting calendar when the arena hosts a four-day international competition between up to four jousting teams. The four teams compete from Good Friday to Easter Sunday against each other, with the tournament final on Easter Monday. Summer sees the jousting season close with the last tournament of the year, an individual joust with jousters from all over the world competing for The Queen's Golden Jubilee Trophy.

=== Pattern Room ===
In 2005 the Ministry of Defence's Pattern Room collection was transferred to the museum. This consisted of over 13,000 firearms.

=== Original logo ===
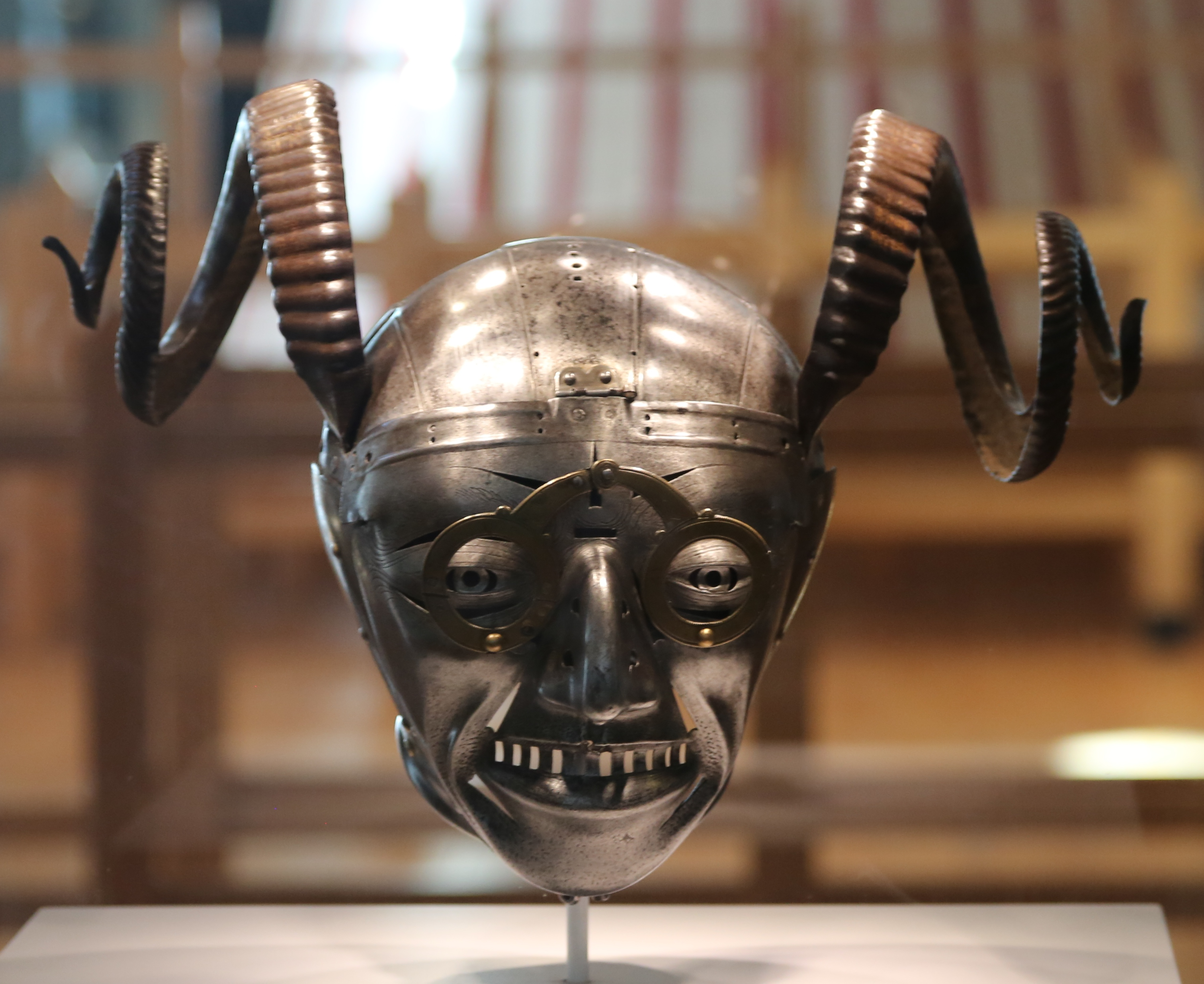
The Horned Helmet that was the basis for the museum's original logo

Former Royal Armouries Museum logo, designed by Minale Tattersfield.

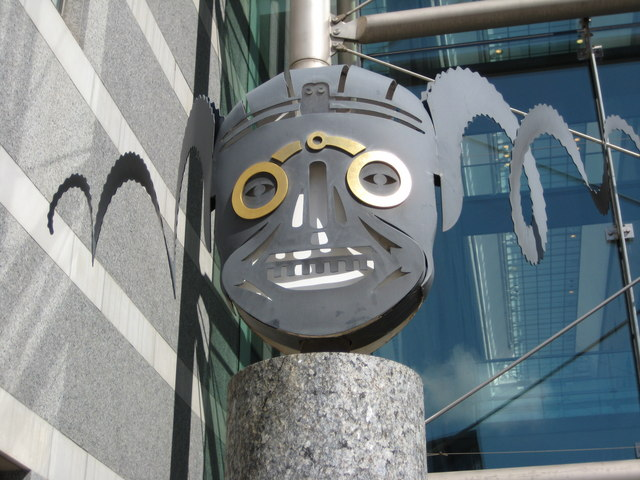
Mask sculpture outside the museum

== In popular culture ==
The museum is mentioned in the Kaiser Chiefs song "Team Mate", from the band's debut album, Employment.

The Nightmare Stacks, by Charles Stross, is mainly set in and around Leeds and the novel's title is an allusion to the museum's holdings.

The GameSpot YouTube series "Firearms Expert Reacts" was filmed on the museum grounds and features the Royal Armouries Keeper of Firearms and Artillery, Jonathan Ferguson, analyzing the design and use of firearms in popular video games.
