= Konrad Seusenhofer =

German armourer

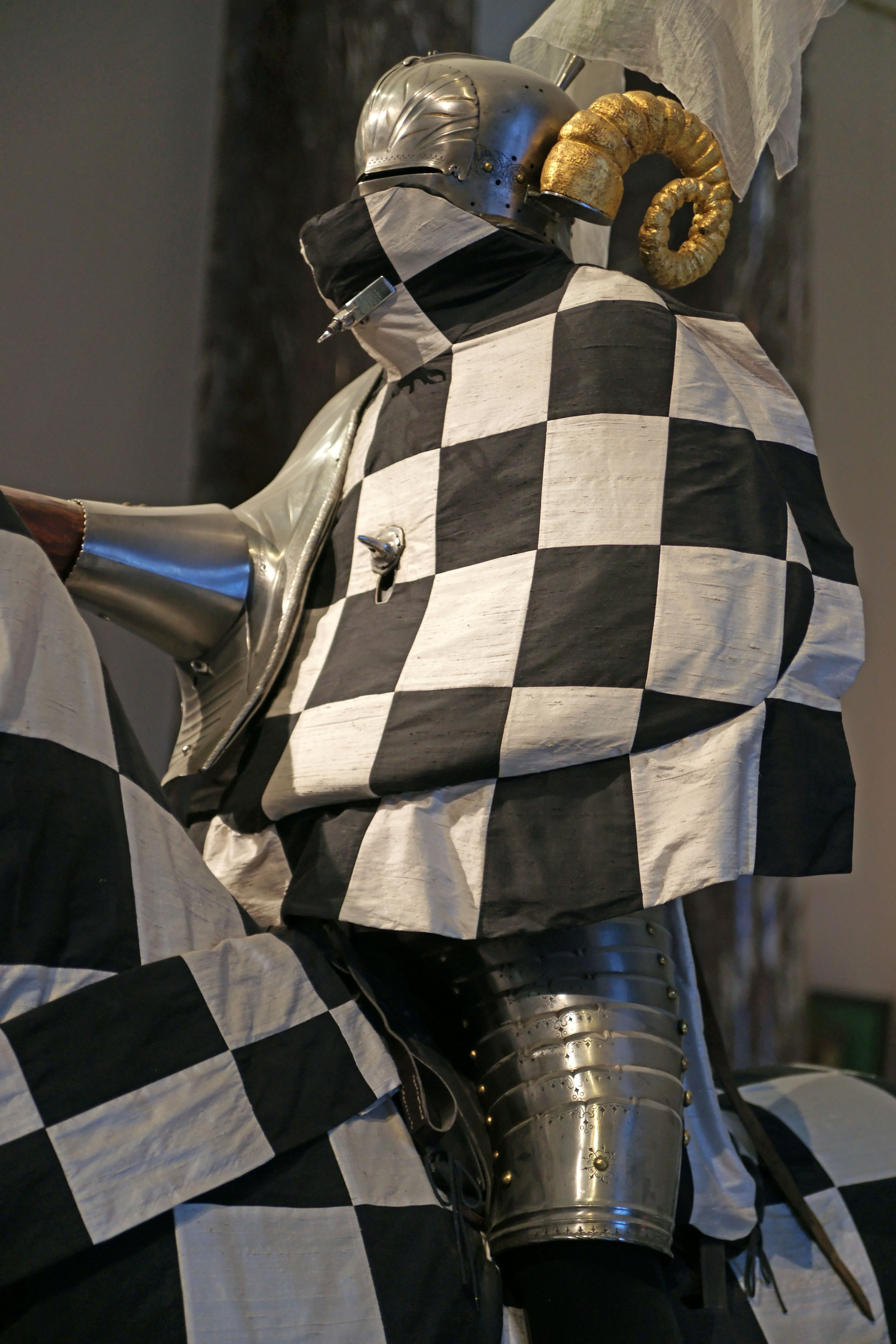
Armour of Emperor Maximilian I, c1515

Konrad Seusenhofer (died 30 August 1517, in Innsbruck, Tirol) was a leading 16th-century Austrian armourer who worked for Maximilian I, Holy Roman Emperor.

In 1514 Maximilian I presented Henry VIII with a suit of armour which included the most unusual ‘Horned helmet’ or armet, later chosen as the symbol of the Royal Armouries Museum in Leeds. Three suits of similar design were made by Seusenhofer, but only the armour given to Maximilian's grandson, the future Emperor Charles V, survives intact in Vienna. Henry's armour no longer survives and, because of its extraordinary appearance, the horned helmet was thought to have been that of the jester Will Somers. Originally the helmet had silver-gilt panels placed over rich, velvet cloth.
