= Antonio Missaglia =

Italian armourer

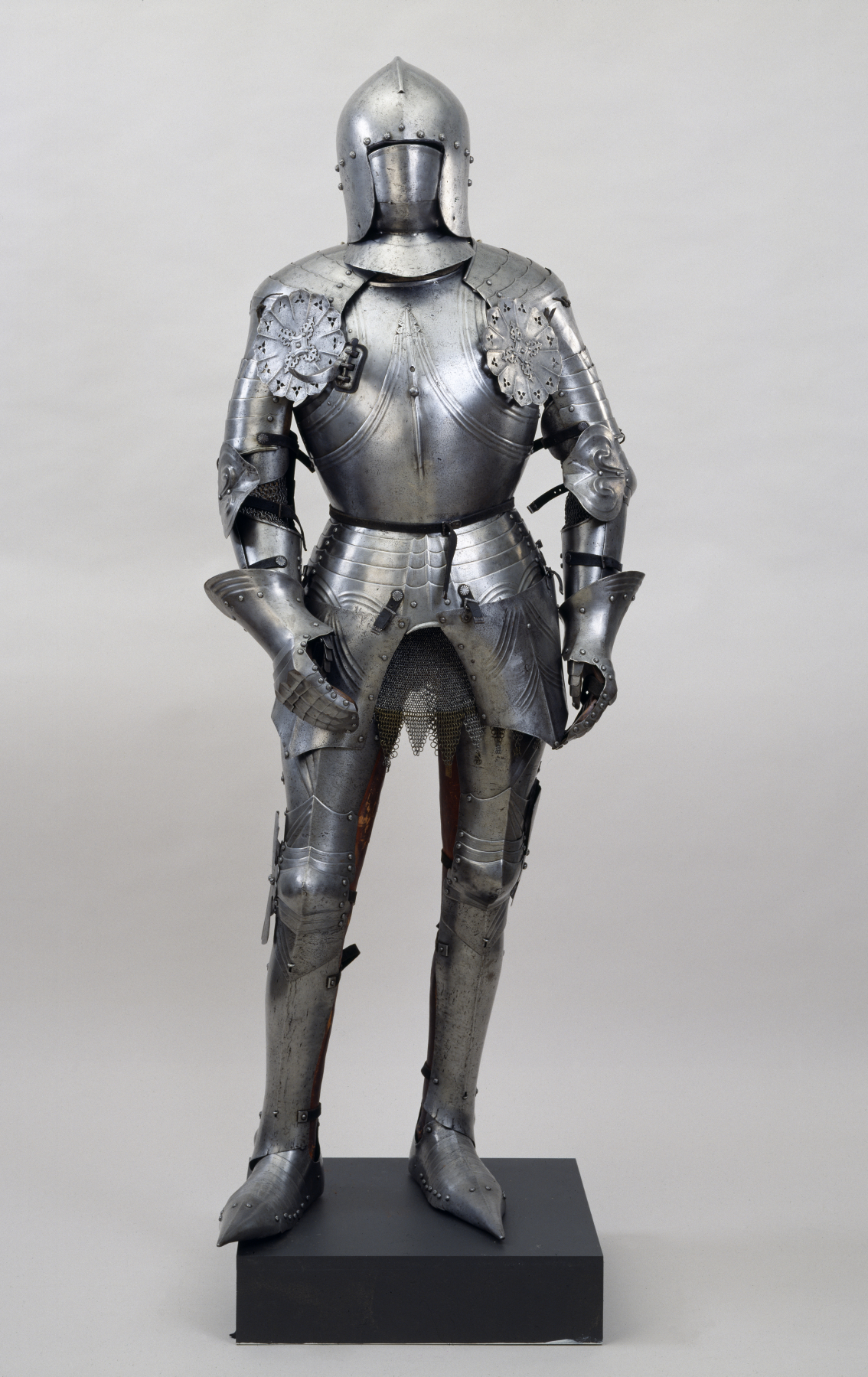
- Sallet and armor by Antonio Missaglia, Walters Art Museum, 1450
- Born: Antonio Negroni; 1416/1417
- Died: 1495/1496
- Occupation: Armourer
- Relatives: Tommaso Negroni

Antonio Missaglia (1416/17–1495/96) was an Italian armourer.

Missaglia's last name was a nickname taken by the artist based on where he was born (Missaglia). The original family name was Negroni. Both Antonio and his brother Tommaso created armor by trade, primarily to nobles and knights in Milan. Some of Missaglia's pieces can be seen at the Kunsthistorisches Museum.
