= São Paulo Museum of Art =

Art museum in São Paulo, Brazil

The São Paulo Museum of Art
- Museu de Arte de São Paulo Assis Chateaubriand
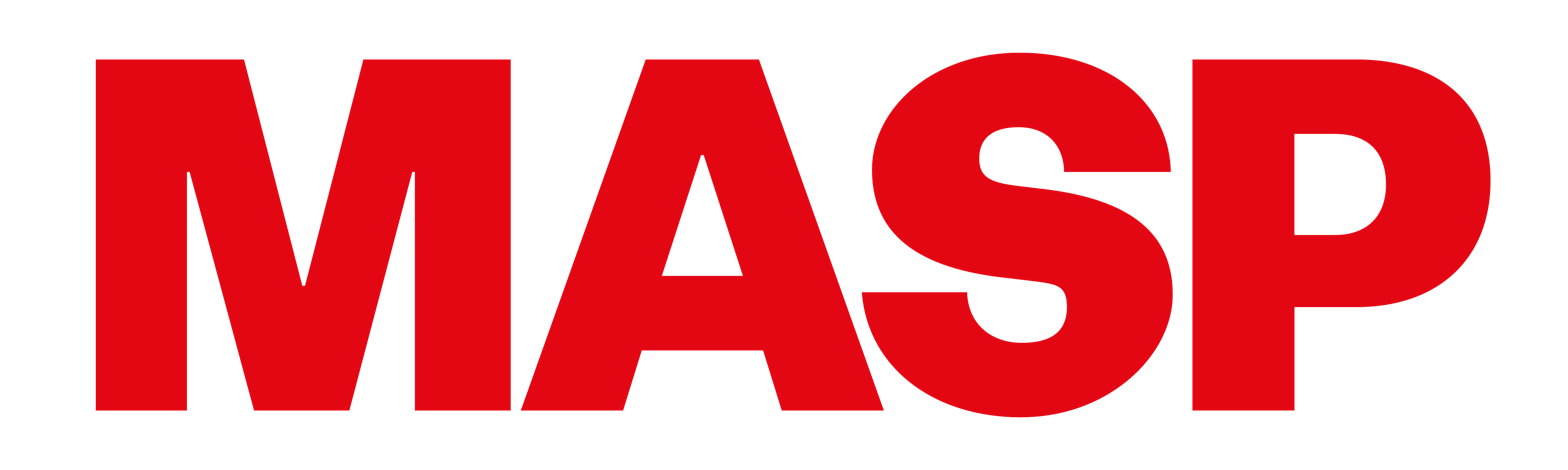

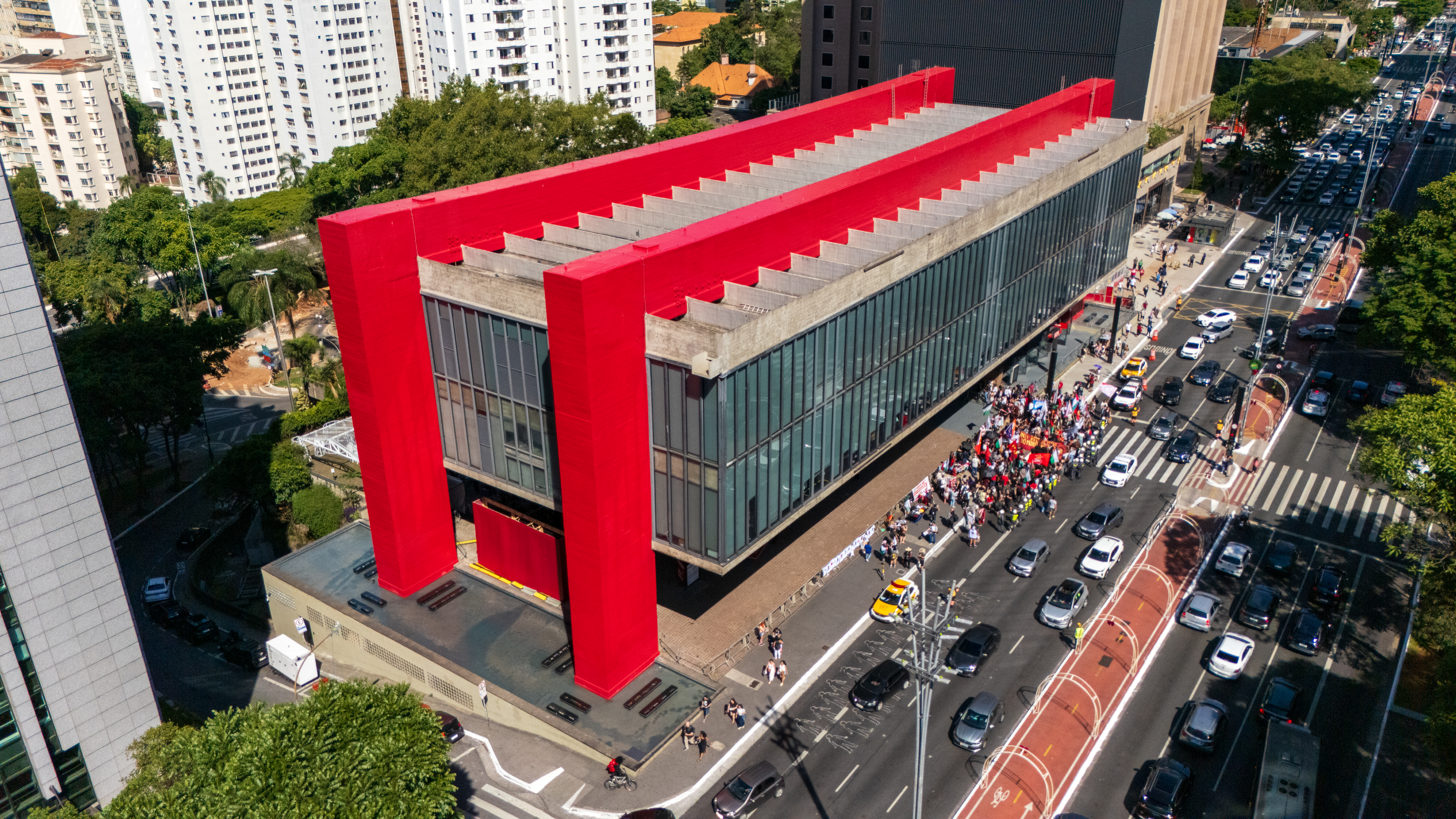
- The Lina Bo Bardi building and Pietro Maria Bardi (black, background) building of the São Paulo Museum of Art (MASP)

- Location of São Paulo Museum of Art in São Paulo São Paulo Museum of Art (Brazil)
- Interactive fullscreen map
- Established: 1947
- Location: Avenida Paulista 1578, São Paulo, Brazil
- Coordinates: 23°33′40″S 46°39′21″W
- Visitors: 729,325 (in 2019)
- Director: Heitor Martins
- Curator: Adriano Pedrosa
- Architects: Lina Bo Bardi, horizontal block & Martin Corullon, vertical block
- Public transit access: Trianon-Masp
- Website: www.masp.org.br

The São Paulo Museum of Art (Portuguese: Museu de Arte de São Paulo, or MASP) is an art museum in São Paulo, Brazil. It is well known for the architectural significance of its headquarters, a 1968 concrete and glass structure designed by Lina Bo Bardi. It is considered a landmark of the city and a symbol of modern Brazilian architecture, and one of the most-visited art museums in the world.

The museum was founded in 1947 by Assis Chateaubriand and Pietro Maria Bardi, and is maintained as a non-profit institution. MASP distinguished itself by its involvement in several important initiatives concerning museology and art education in Brazil, as well as for its pioneering role as a cultural center. It was also the first Brazilian museum to display post-World War II art.

The museum is internationally recognized for its collection of European art, considered to be one of the finest in both Latin America and the Southern Hemisphere. It also houses an important collection of Brazilian art, prints and drawings, as well as smaller collections of African and Asian art, antiquities, decorative arts, and others, amounting to more than 8,000 pieces. MASP also contains one of the largest art libraries in the country. The entire collection was placed on the Brazilian National Heritage list by Brazil's Institute of History and Art.

== History ==
=== General context ===
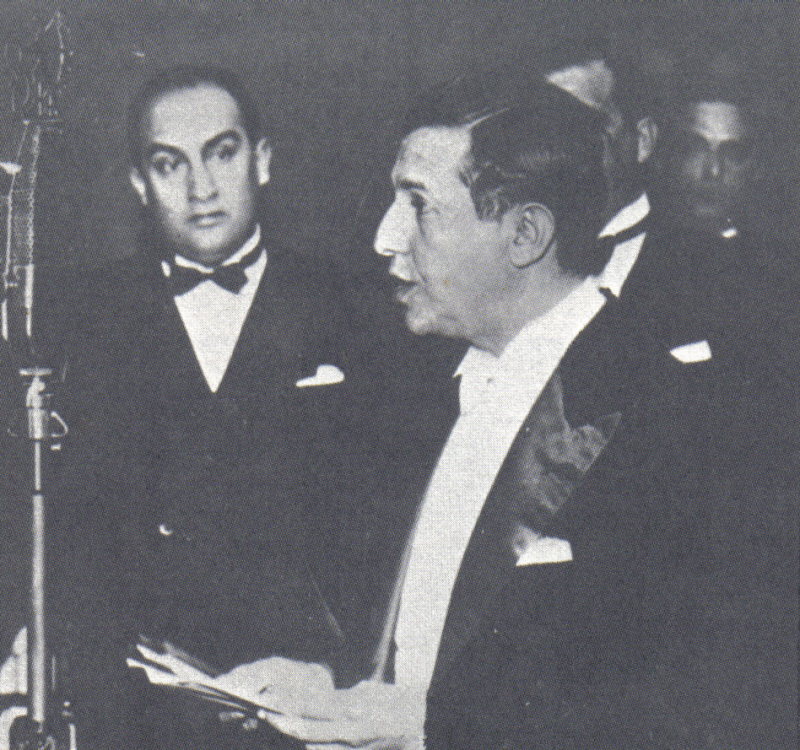
Assis Chateaubriand.

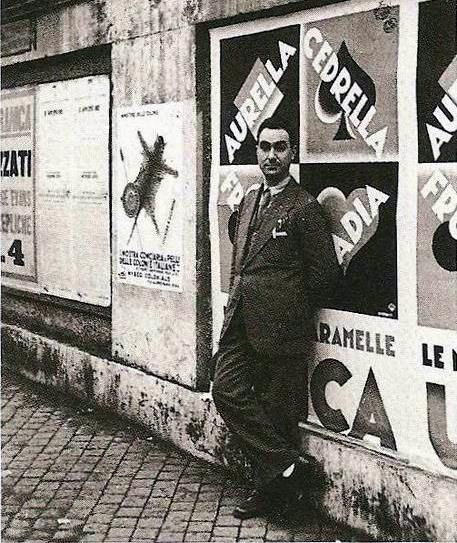
Pietro Maria Bardi.

At the end of the 1940s, the Brazilian economy was going through large structural changes as a result of accelerating industrialization. The city of São Paulo subsequently established itself as the most important industrial hub in the country. Prior to that time, São Paulo's role in modern art had been marked by the Week of Modern Art of 1922. Despite the importance this event had enjoyed in the 1920s, Modernism wouldn't draw much attention of city dwellers and institutions in the following decades. There was only one art museum in São Paulo, the Pinacoteca do Estado, solely devoted to Academic art, and a commercial gallery.

Assis Chateaubriand, founder and owner of the Diários Associados, or "Associated Daily Press", the largest media and press conglomerate of Brazil at the time, was one of the most influential individuals of this period. In the late 1940s, Chateaubriand started a campaign to acquire masterpieces to form an art collection of international renown in Brazil. He intended to host the museum in Rio de Janeiro, but ultimately chose São Paulo, where he believed it would be easier to gather the necessary funds, since this city was enjoying a very prosperous moment. At the same time, the European art market had been deeply influenced by the end of World War II, making it possible to acquire fine artworks for reasonable prices.

With the help of Pietro Maria Bardi, an Italian professor, critic, art dealer and former owner of galleries in Milan and Rome, Chateaubriand created a "Museum of Classical and Modern Art". Though he initially planned to lead the project for only a year, Bardi dedicated the rest of his life to it. He moved to Brazil together with his wife, the architect Lina Bo Bardi, and brought along his library and his private art collection.

=== Beginnings (1947–1957) ===
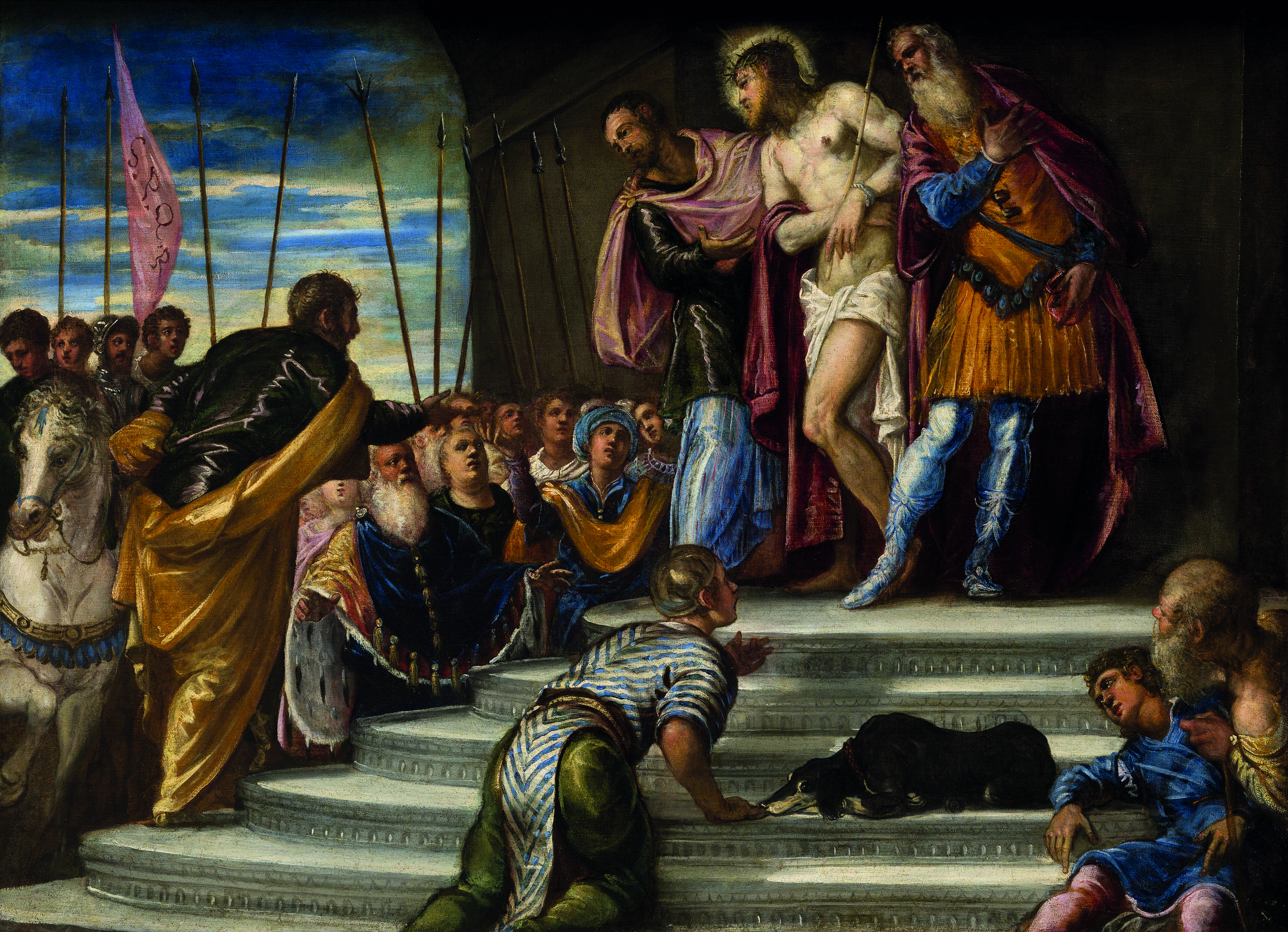
Tintoretto (Italian, 1518–1594). Ecce Homo, 1546–47. Oil on panel, 109 x 136 cm

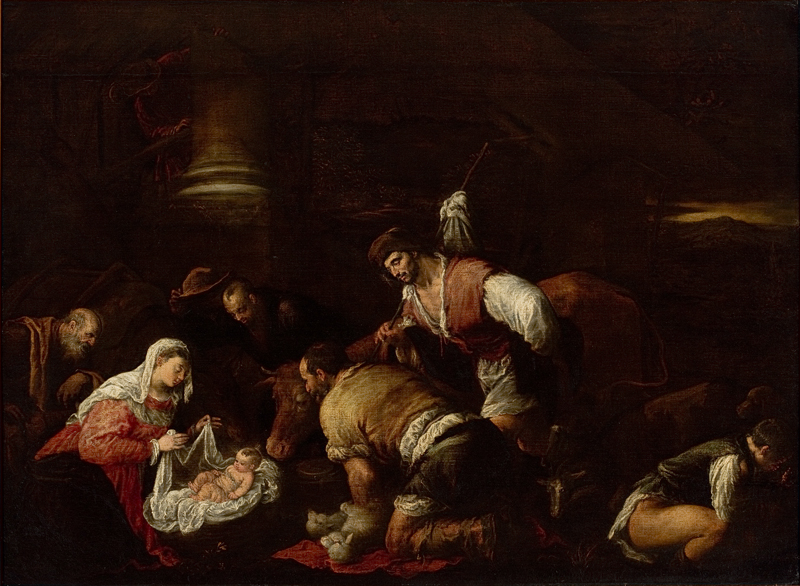
Jacopo Bassano (Italian, 1515–1522). Adoration of the Shepherds, 1580–90. Oil on wood, 140.5 x 190.5 cm.

The museum was inaugurated and opened to the public on 2 October 1947, displaying the first acquisitions, among them canvases by Picasso and Rembrandt. In these first years of activity, the museum was located on the upper floors of the Diarios Associados headquarters in the Centro neighborhood of São Paulo. Architect Lina Bo Bardi was in charge of adapting the building to the needs of the museum, dividing it into four distinct areas: an art gallery, a didactic exposition room about the history of art, a temporary exhibition room and an auditorium.

MASP was the first Brazilian art museum interested in acquiring works of modern art. The museum quickly became a meeting point for artists, students and intellectuals, attracted not only by its holdings, but also by the workshops and art courses it offered.

In the 1950s, the museum created the Institute of Contemporary Art (offering workshops of engraving, drawing, painting, sculpture, dance and industrial design), the Publicity School (presently Superior School of Propaganda and Marketing), organizing debates about cinema and literature and creating a youth orchestra and a ballet company. The courses were frequently given by important names of the Brazilian artistic scene, such as the painters Lasar Segall and Roberto Sambonet, the architects Gian Carlo Palanti and Lina Bo Bardi, the sculptor August Zamoyski, and the motion-picture technician Alberto Cavalcanti.

Along with the amplification of the educational program, the museum expanded its collection and began to be recognized internationally. Between 1953 and 1957, a selection of 100 masterpieces housed in the museum traveled throughout European museums, such as Musée de l'Orangerie (Paris) and the Tate Gallery (London), in a series of exhibitions organized with the intent of consolidating the collection. In 1957, the collection was also displayed in the United States at the Metropolitan Museum of Art in New York City and in the Toledo Museum of Art. The following year, the holdings of MASP were exhibited at other Brazilian venues, such as the Museu Nacional de Belas Artes, in Rio de Janeiro. This established the museum on a global level.

=== Consolidation of the museum ===
The collection's rising growth and importance soon required the construction of a building to headquarter the museum. With that purpose, the São Paulo City Hall donated a plot of ground, previously occupied by the Belvedere Trianon – a traditional meeting point of the Paulistano wealthy, which had been demolished in 1951 – to host the first edition of São Paulo Art Biennial. The ground on Paulista Avenue had been donated to the City Hall with the condition that the view to the downtown area and the valley of the Nove de Julho Avenue be preserved.

The new MASP building was the brainchild of Lina Bo Bardi. To preserve the required view of the downtown area, Bardi idealized a building suspended above ground, supported by four massive rectangular columns made of concrete. The construction is considered to be unique worldwide for its peculiarity: the main body of the building stands on four lateral supporting pillars, generating a free area of 74 meters underneath the sustained building. Constructed between 1956 and 1968, the new site of the museum was inaugurated on 7 November by Queen Elizabeth II of the United Kingdom during her visit to Brazil.

Assis Chateaubriand would not get to see the inauguration of the new building. He died months before, a victim of thrombosis. The media empire which he developed had also been facing difficulties since the beginning of the 1960s. Growing debts and the competition in the media market by Roberto Marinho's press conglomerate – caused the scarcity of the funds which had permitted the gathering of the collection.

The overthrow of Diários Associados and the death of its founder made the government intervene and pay for some of the debts contracted with foreign institutions. During the government of president Juscelino Kubitschek, Caixa Econômica Federal granted a loan to honor the financial obligations of the institution and secured the loan with its art collections. Years later, in the 1970s, the museum's debt with the Brazilian government was negotiated and paid off.

In 1969, in response to a request by the museum, the Brazilian Institute for Historic and Artistic Heritage (IPHAN) registered MASP's holdings as part of the national heritage.

In the 1970s the museum gained fame in the Eastern Hemisphere by organizing many exhibitions using selected works of its collection at Japanese museums. In 1973, the collection was presented at the Ministry of Foreign Relations in Brasília. MASP's collection was presented again in Japan in 1978/79, 1982/83, 1990/91, and 1995. In 1992, works of the French school and Brazilian landscapes were exhibited in the Museo Nacional de Bellas Artes, in Santiago, Chile, and in the Biblioteca Luís Angel Aragón, in Bogotá.

== The building ==
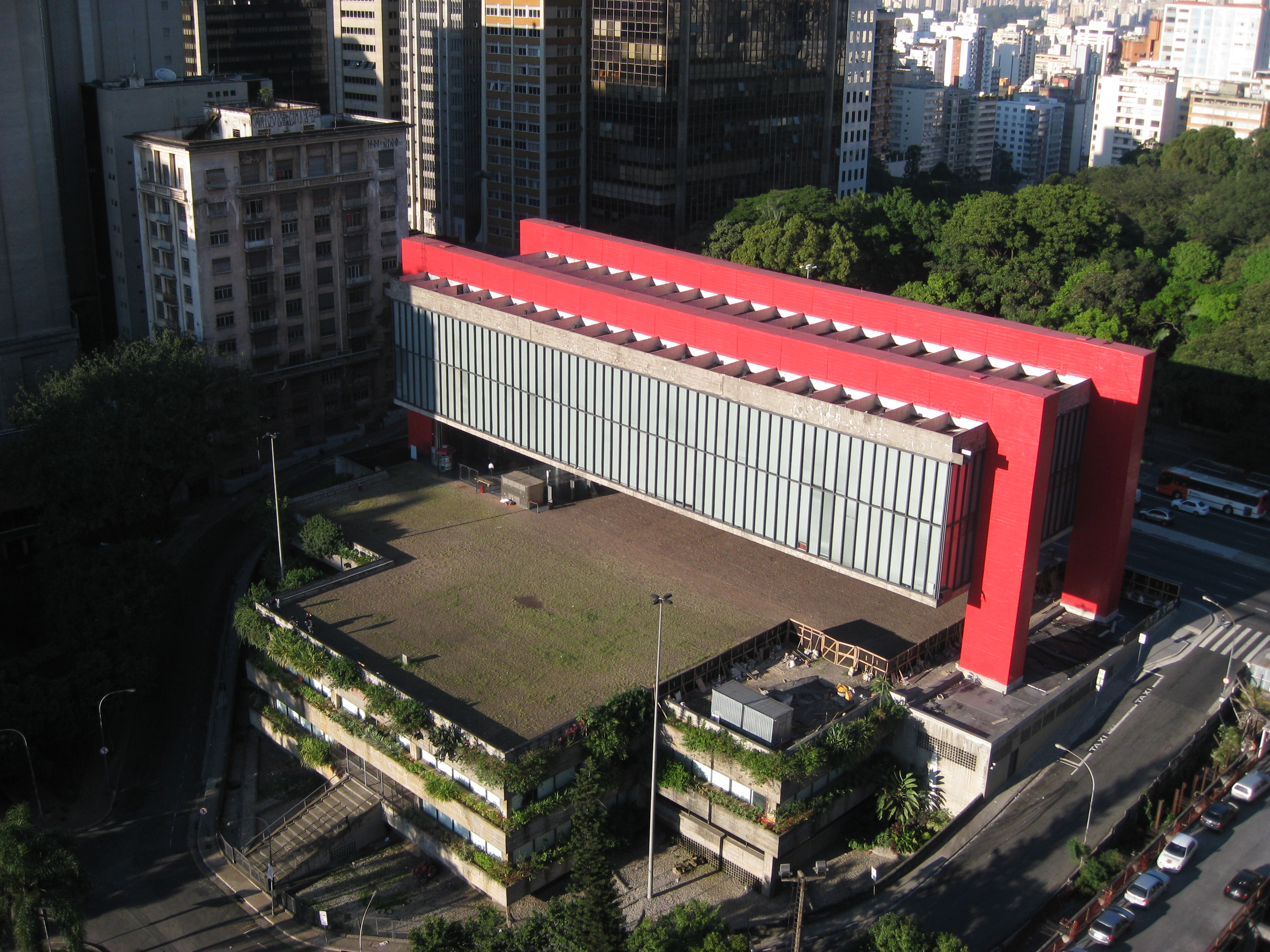
Aerial view of MASP

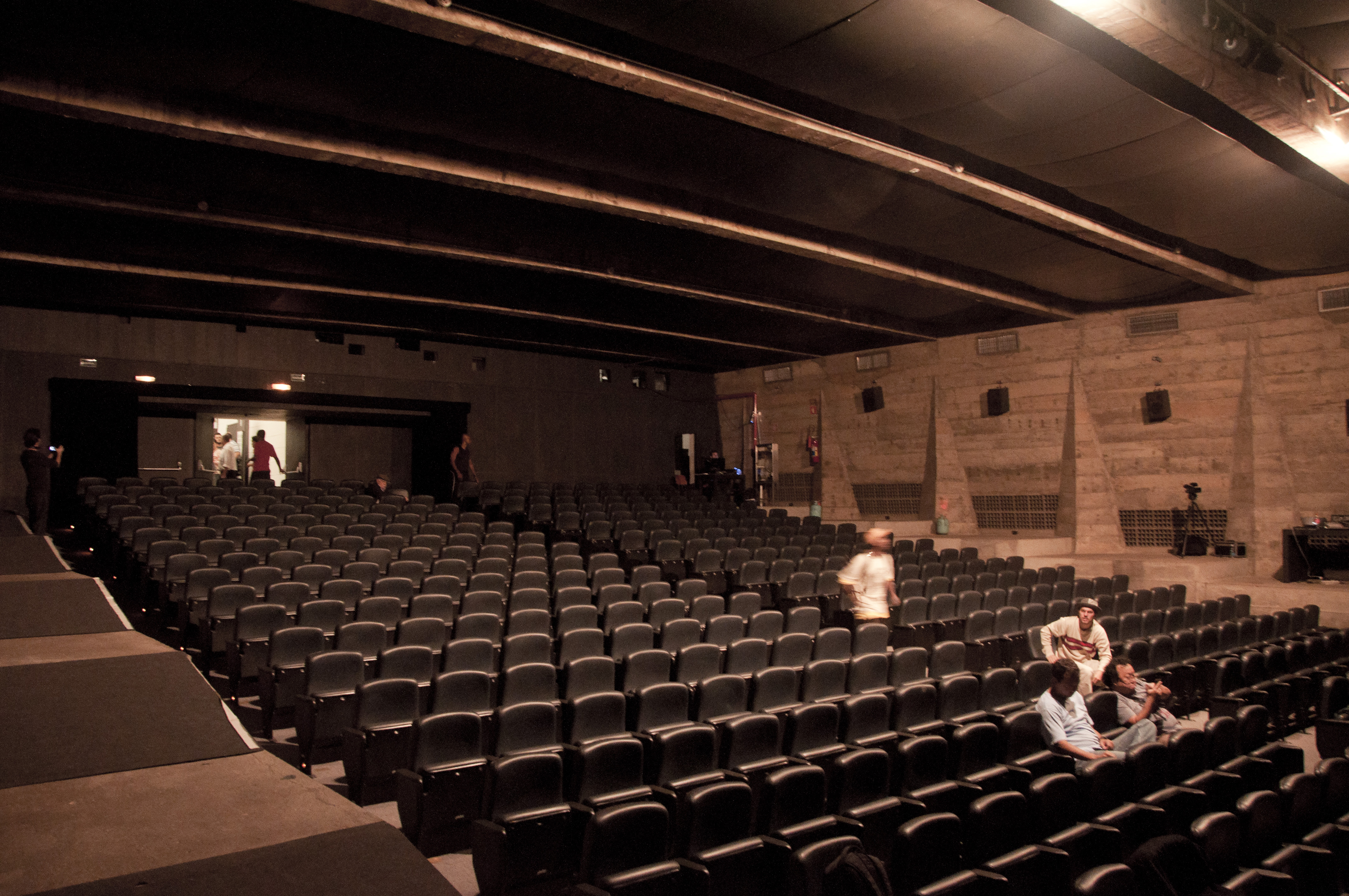
MASP auditorium

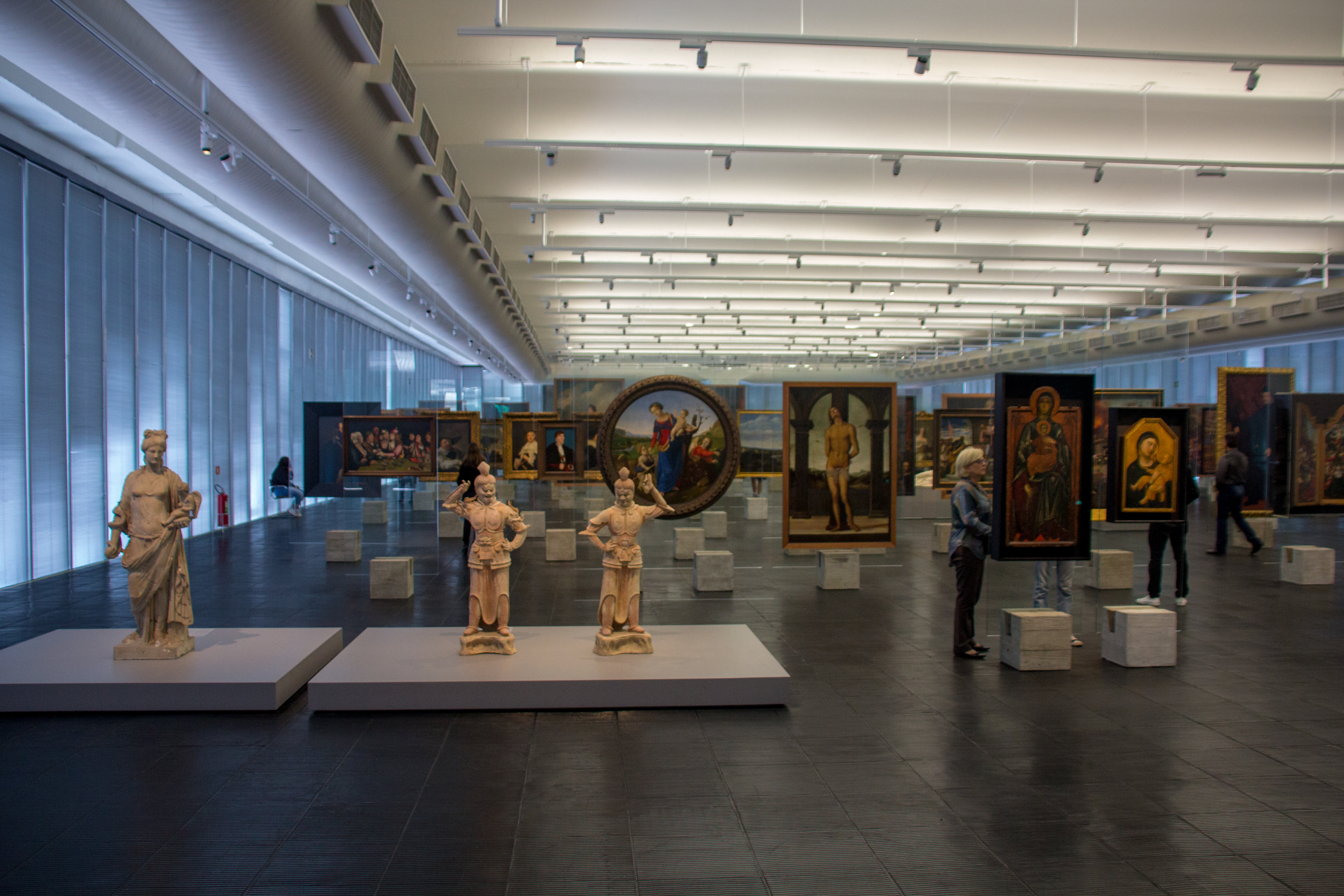
Exhibition room, São Paulo Museum of Art

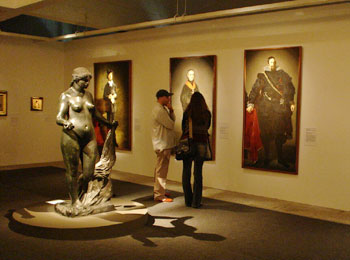
Exhibition of the "100 Maravilhas"

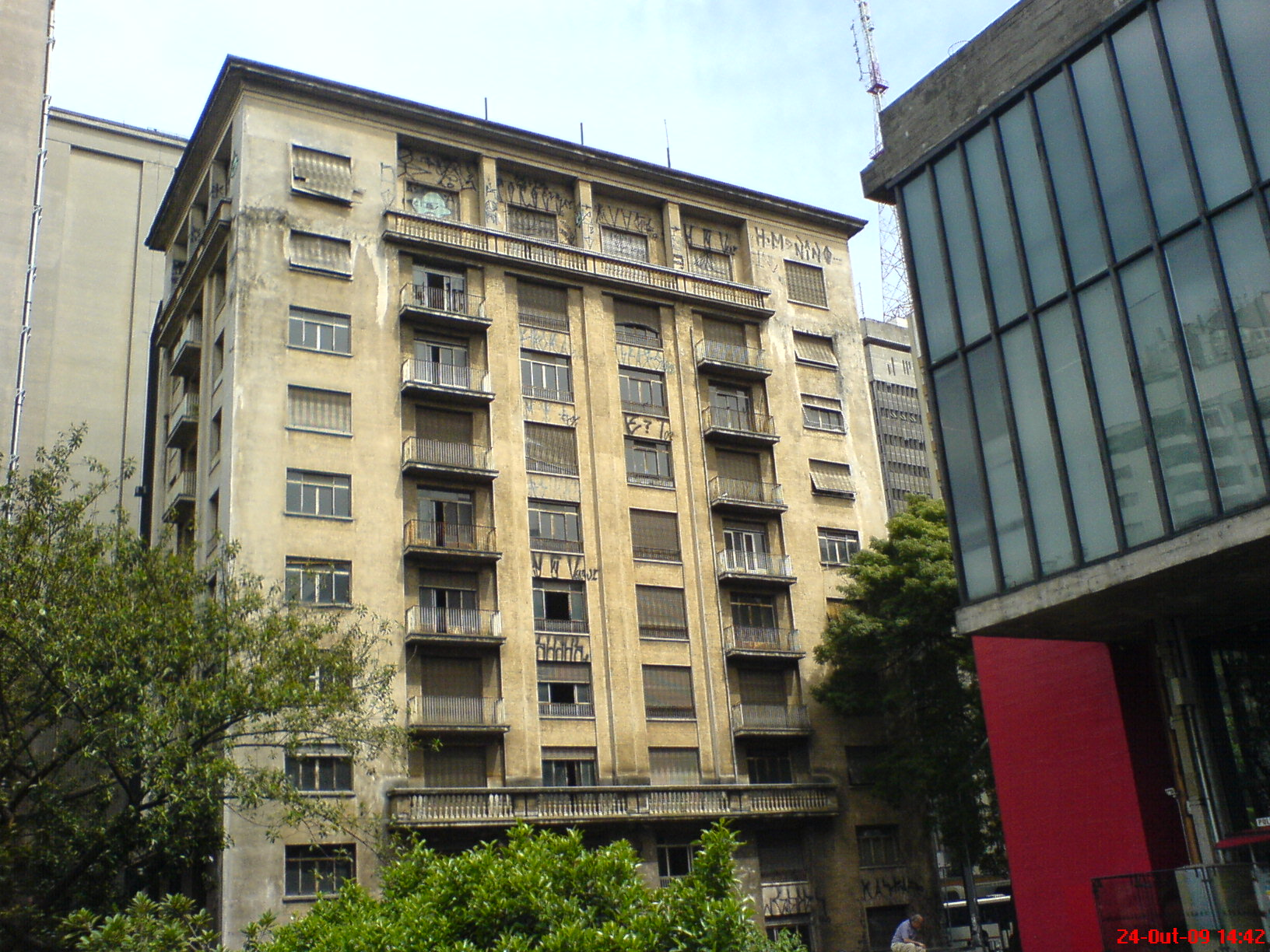
Demolished Dumont Adams Highrise, where the museum's annex now sits

Construction on the present building of the museum began in 1957, and the building was inaugurated in 1968 and has 25 m high. MASP is famous for its remarkable Brazilian modern architecture structure, and it is considered one of the landmarks of city. It is located on the former site of Belvedere Trianon on Paulista Avenue, from which it was possible to see the Centro of São Paulo at that time and the Cantareira Mountains beyond. José Borges de Figueiredo, the investor who sold the plot of ground to the City Hall, wrote a non-binding letter to the administration, asking that it to be preserved as a "public place in perpetuity". While in the following years multiple proposed projects ignored his wish, the architect Lina Bo Bardi and engineer José Carlos Figueiredo Ferraz ultimately conceived an underground block as well as a reinforced concrete in tension suspended structure. The structure stands 8 meters above the ground, supported by 4 pillars connected by two huge concrete beams. A free space of 74 metres (243 ft) between the pillars was the largest free span in the world at that time. The building inaugurated the so-called protected reinforced concrete technique in Brazil. Each of the 2 floors of exposition has some 7 meters of ceiling.

In the construction, totalling approximately 10,000 square metres (110,000 sq ft), there are – besides the permanent and temporary exhibition galleries – library, photo gallery, film gallery, video gallery, 2 auditoriums, restaurant, store, workshop rooms, administrative offices and a technical area. The building's installations and finishing are homely, as Lina Bo herself described: "Concrete visible, whitewash, a flagstone flooring covering the great Civic Hall, tempered glass, plastic walls. Industrial black rubber flooring covering inner spaces. The belvedere is a 'square', with plants and flowers around, paved with parallelepipeds, according to Iberian-Brazilian tradition. There are also water spaces, small water mirrors with aquatic plants. [...] I didn't search for beauty. I've searched for freedom". In 2003, the building was also registered as national patrimony by Brazilian Institute for Historic and Artistic Heritage.

In the museographic area, Lina Bo Bardi also innovated by using tempered crystal sheets leaned on concrete blocks bases as display supports for the paintings. The intention is to imitate the position of the canvas on the painter's easel, but it also has roots in interwar Italian exhibition design. In the reverse of these supports, which are not used anymore, there were labels with information about the painter and the work. Paradoxically, the museum abandoned this model of exhibition at the end of the 1990s, when the method was beginning to be noticed and implemented by foreign institutions and artists.

Between 1996 and 2001, the current administration of the museum undertook a vast and controversial reform. Despite the indispensable restoration of the general structure, dramatic changes implemented by the architect and former director of the institution Julio Neves included the substitution of the original floor conceived by Lina Bo, the installation of a second elevator, the construction of a third underground floor, and the substitution of the water mirrors for gardens. Some architects allege that the reform caused a profound distortion of Lina's original project.

In 2021 the museum planned to build a 14-story 72 m high extension with an underground link to its current building, which was completed by the end of 2024 and opened in March 2025. The construction cost R$250 million and expanded the exhibition area from 10.485 m^{2} to 21.863 m^{2}. The annex, called Edifício Pietro Maria Bardi, was built in a style of a modern black monolith, replacing completely the 1954 10-story art-deco styled Dumont Adams Highrise. From 2013 to 2019 there was a negotiation of R$13 million with mobile telephone company Vivo to build a 125 m high observation tower, of architect Julio Neves, in the place, but they were unsuccessful.

== The collection ==
=== The formation of the collection ===
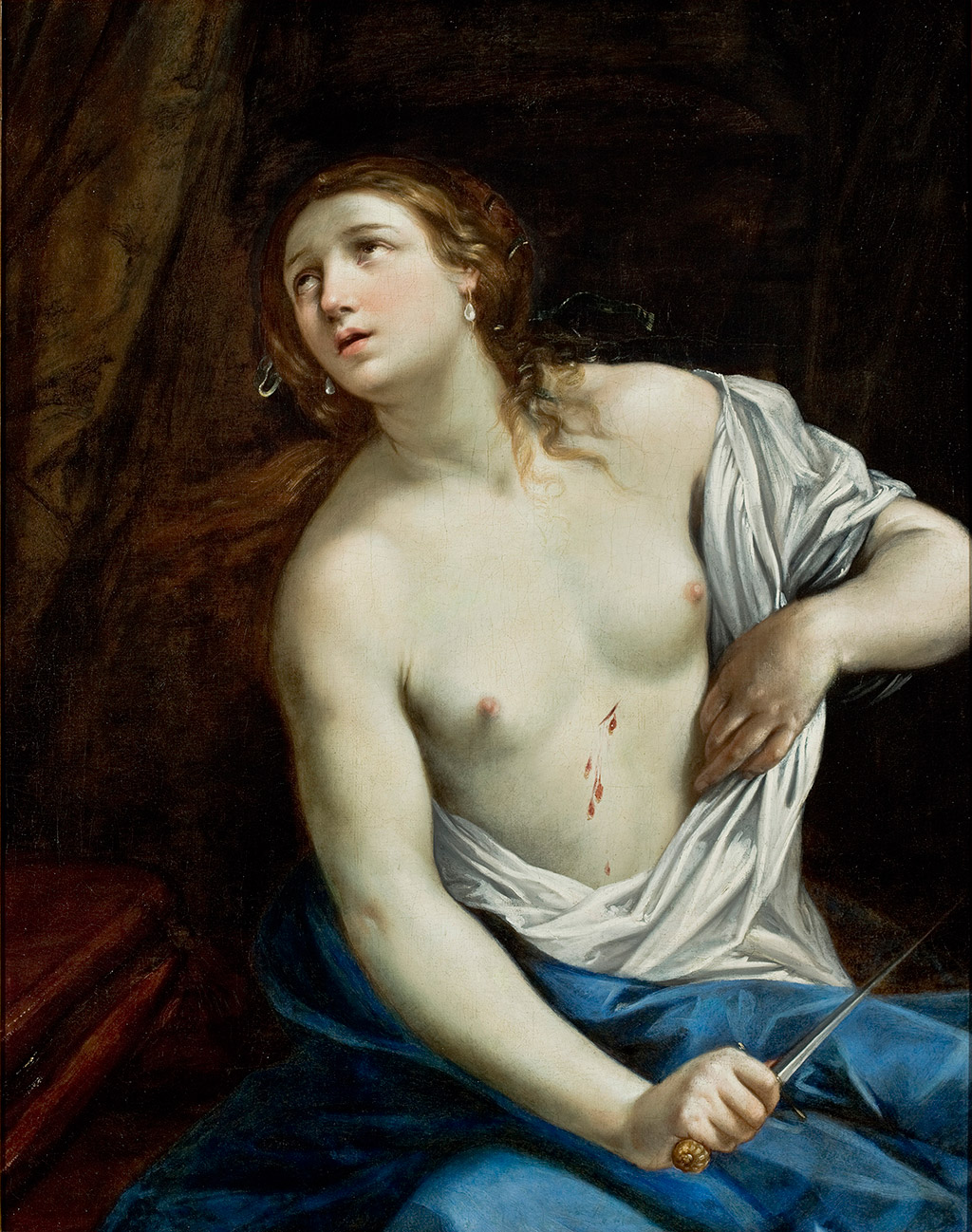
Guido Reni and Workshop (Italian, 1575–1642). Suicide of Lucretia, 1625–40.

The main body of the collection was assembled between 1947 and 1960. Pietro Maria Bardi, formerly owner of commercial galleries in Milan and Rome, was in charge of searching and selecting the works which should be acquired, while Chateaubriand looked for donors and patrons, trying to tempt potential ones with banquets and lavish ceremonies.

These methods drew lots of criticism, as was that the museum acquired works of art without the proper corroboration of authenticity. This impression was endorsed by the fact that the museum was at the time, just after WWII, one of the major buyers of art in the international market. Unlike other institutions, whose acquisitions depended on approval of a curators council, the São Paulo Museum of Art usually acquired its pieces quickly, sometimes by telegram. The works of art were generally acquired at Christie's, Marlborough, Sotheby's, Knoedler, Seligman and Wildenstein.

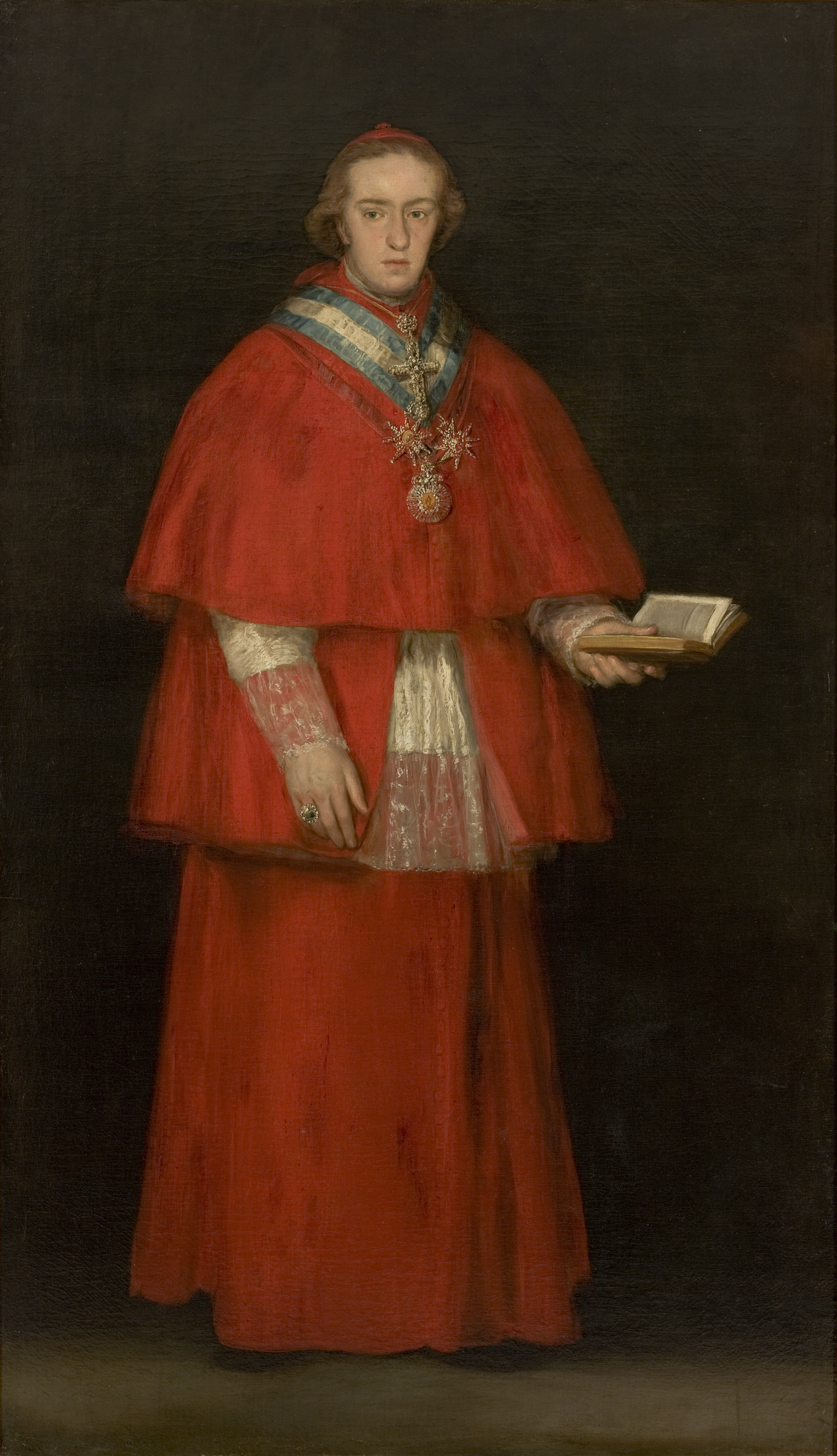
Francisco Goya (Spanish, 1746–1828). Portrait of Cardinal Luis María de Borbón y Vallabriga, c. 1798/1800. Oil on canvas, 200 x 106 cm.

At the end of the 1960s, Chateaubriand's press conglomerate was facing troubles, with growing debts and competition from Roberto Marinho's media companies. The financial difficulties of Diários Associados caused the decline of the museum's financial resources. Consequently, the museum then added to its collection through spontaneous donations of artists, companies and private collectors.

=== Overview of the collection ===
The São Paulo Museum of Art collection is considered the largest and more comprehensive collection of Western art in Latin America. Among the 8,000 works of the museum, the collection of European paintings, sculptures, drawings, engravings, and decorative arts stands out. Early modern French and Italian schools of painting are broadly represented, forming the main body of the collection, followed by Spanish, Portuguese, Flemish, Dutch, English and German masters.

The museum also keeps a significant collection of Brazilian art and Brasiliana, which shows the development of Brazilian art from the 17th century to the present. The museum also possesses important holdings of Latin American art and North American art.

On a smaller scale, the museum's holdings include representative objects of many periods and distinct non-Western civilizations – such as African and Asian arts – and others which stand out for their technological, archaeological, historic, and artistic relevance, like the select collections of Egyptian, Etruscan, Greek and Roman antiquities, besides other artifacts of Pre-Columbian cultures and medieval European art.

==== Paintings ====
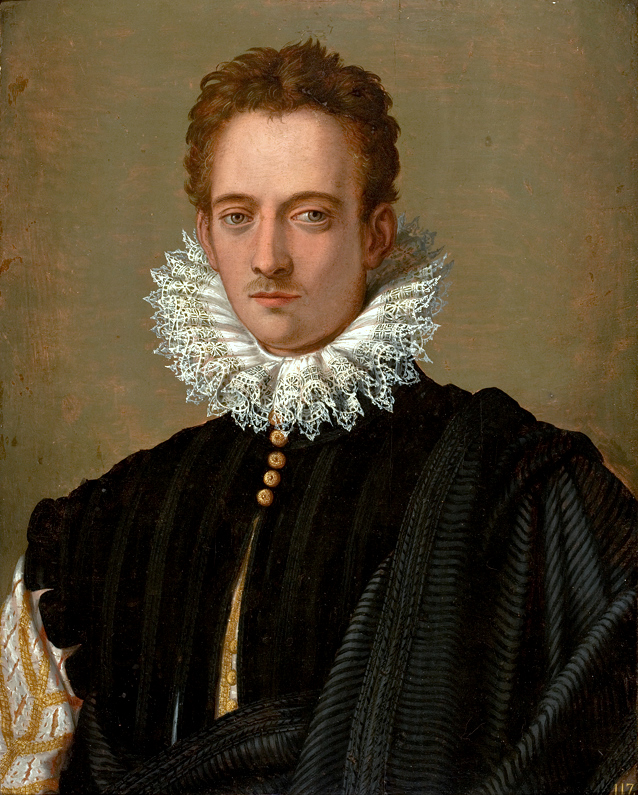
Alessandro Allori and Workshop (1535–1607) Portrait of a Florentine Noble

Italian school

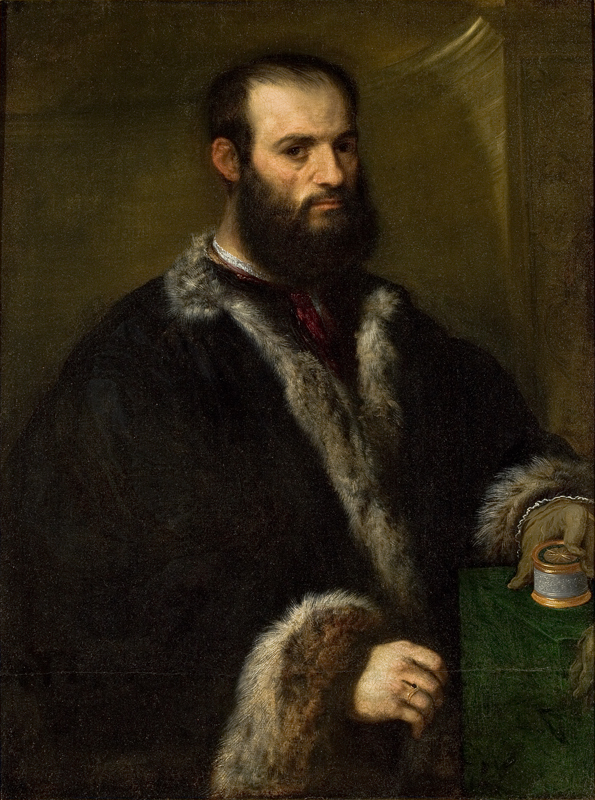
Paris Bordone (Italian, 1500–1570) Portrait of Alvise Contarini, 1525–50.

- Tiziano Vecelli (known as Titian) – 1 painting
- Tintoretto, Jacopo Comin – 2 paintings
- Giambattista Pittoni – 1 painting, Dioniso e Ariadne
- Sanzio, Raffaello – 1 Painting, Resurrection of Christ
- Botticelli, Sandro – 1 painting, Virgin and Child with the Infant John the Baptist
- Mantegna, Andrea – 1 painting
- Perugino, Pietro −1 painting
- Allori, Alessandro – 1 painting
- d'Antonio, Biagio – 1 painting
- Bassano, Jacopo (Jacopo dal Ponte) – 1 painting
- Bellini, Giovanni – 1 painting, Madonna Willys
- Bordone, Paris – 1 painting
- Guercino – 1 painting
- di Cosimo, Piero – 1 painting
- Francia, Francesco (Francesco Raibolini) – 1 painting
- Giampietrino (Gian Pietro Rizzi) – 1 painting
- Nelli, Ottaviano – 1 painting
- Reni, Guido – 1 painting
- Saraceni, Carlo – 1 painting
- del Sellaio, Jacopo – 1 painting

Brazil and the Americas

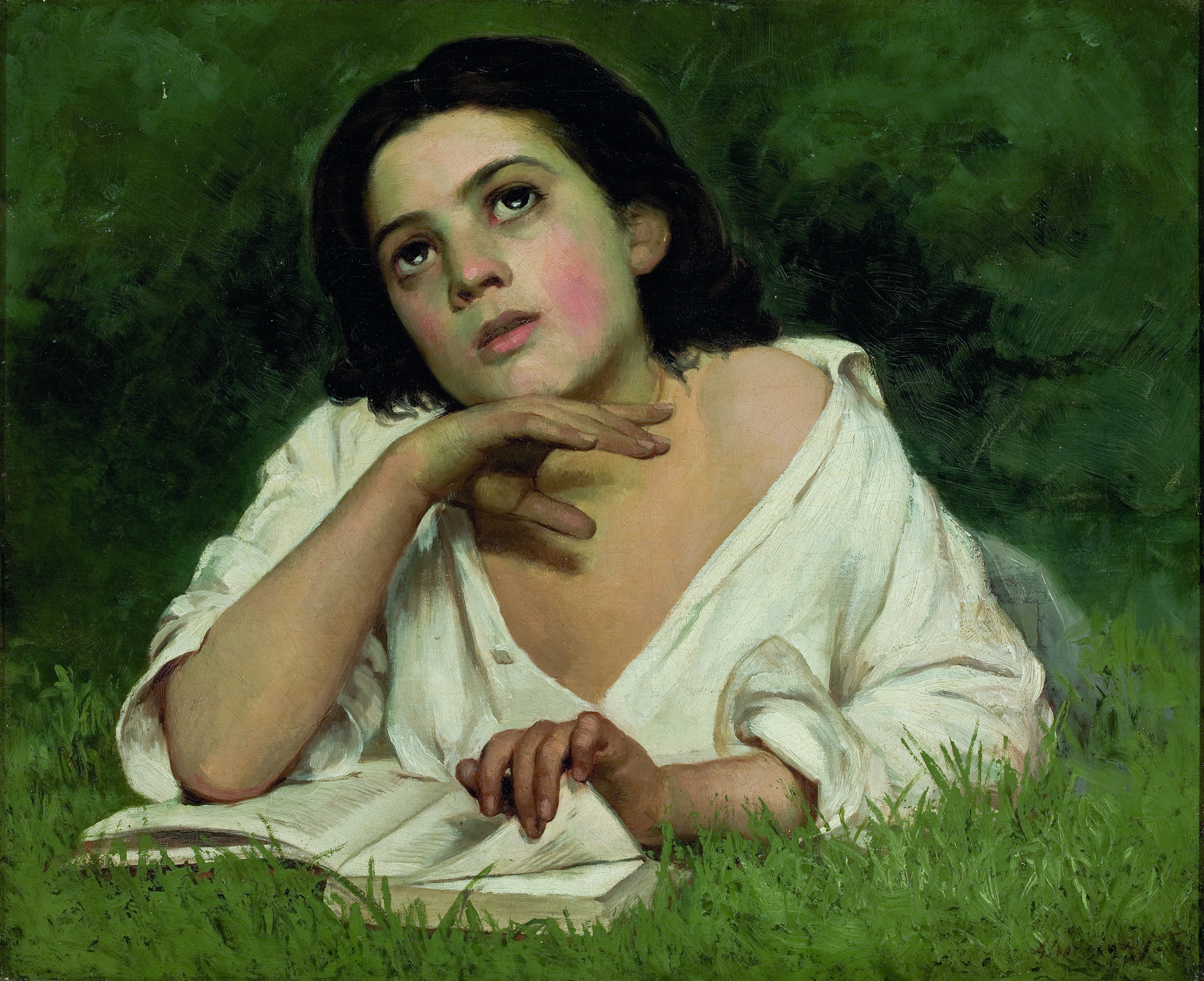
Almeida Júnior (1850–1899). Girl with a Book

- de Almeida Júnior, José Ferraz – 6 paintings
- do Amaral, Tarsila – 2 paintings
- Américo de Figueiredo e Mello, Pedro – 2 paintings
- Calixto de Jesus, Benedito – 3 paintings
- Di Cavalcanti, Emiliano – 2 paintings
- Malfatti, Anita – 2 paintings
- Meirelles de Lima, Victor – 4 paintings
- Portinari, Candido – 17 paintings
- do Rêgo Monteiro, Vicente – 2 paintings
- Rivera, Diego – 2 paintings
- Segall, Lasar – 2 paintings
- Stuart, Gilbert – 1 painting
- Volpi, Alfredo – 1 painting
- Visconti, Eliseu – 2 paintings

French school

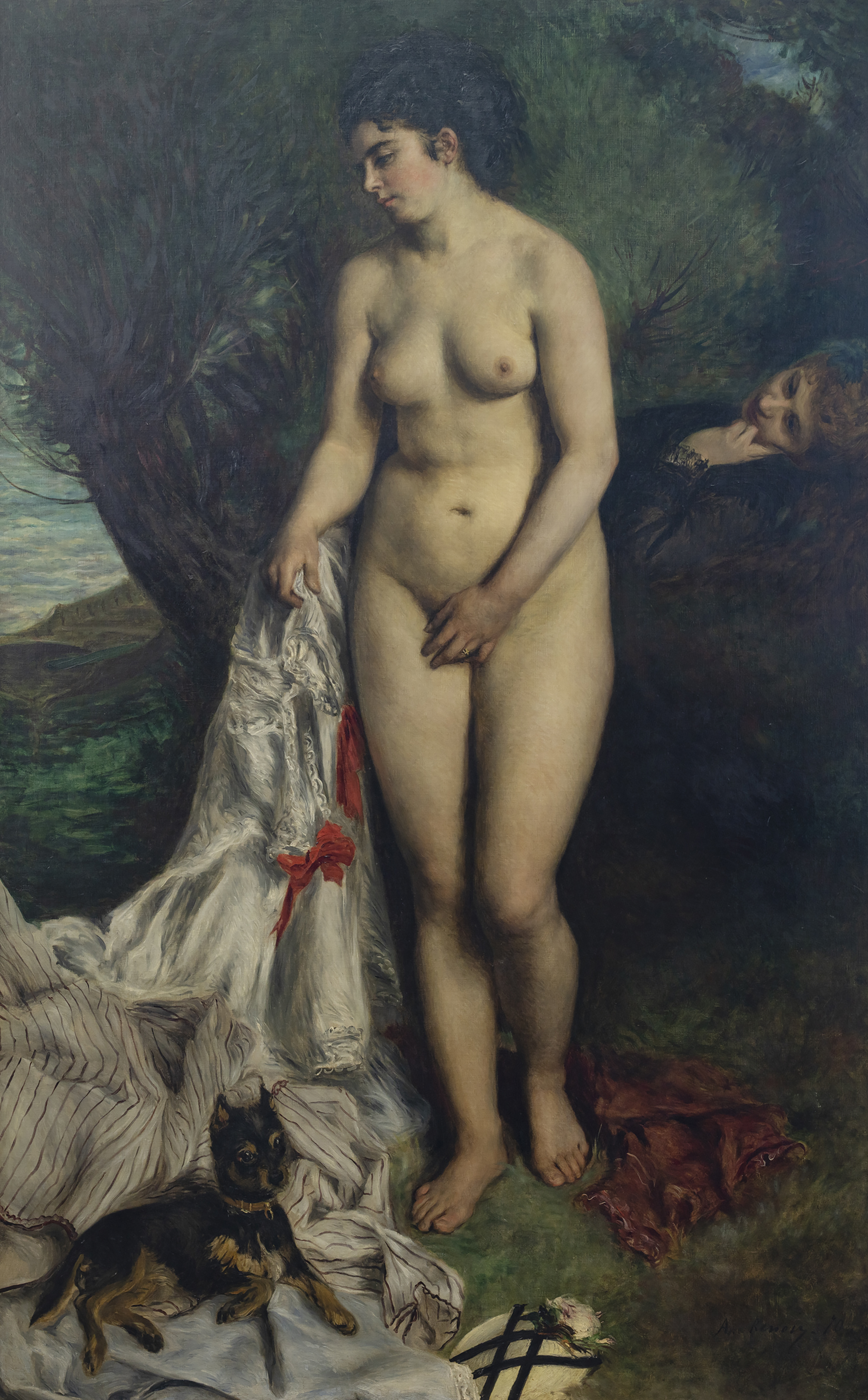
Renoir, Bather with a Griffon Dog, 1870

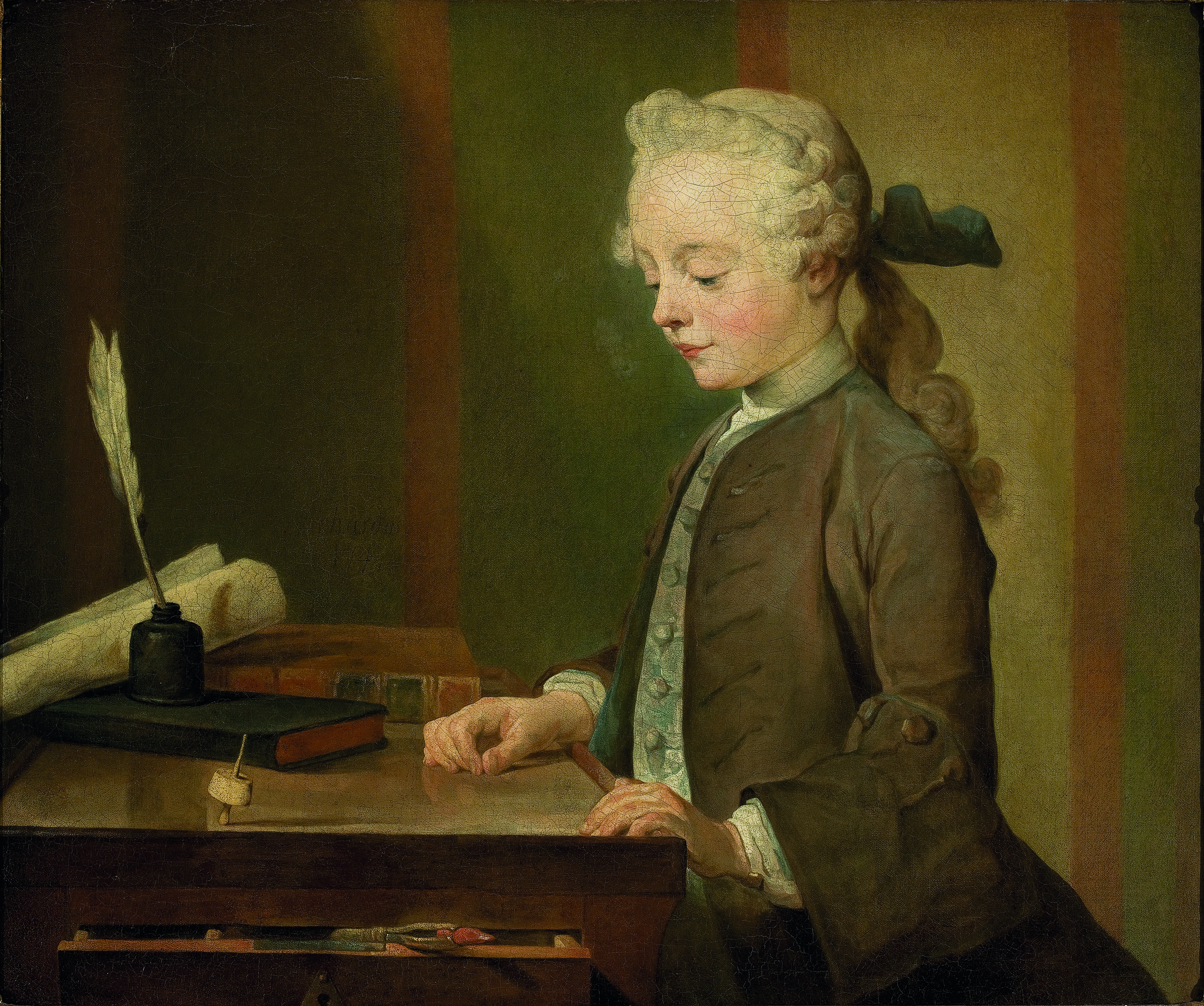
Jean-Baptiste-Siméon Chardin (1699–1779). Portrait of Auguste Gabriel Godefroy, 1741.

- Bonnard, Pierre – 1 painting
- Cézanne, Paul – 5 paintings
- Chardin, Jean-Baptiste-Siméon – 1 painting
- Clouet, François – 1 painting
- Corot, Jean-Baptiste-Camille – 5 paintings
- Courbet, Gustave – 2 paintings
- Debret, Jean-Baptiste – 1 painting
- Degas (Hilaire-Germain-Edgar De Gas) – 3 paintings
- Delacroix, Eugène – 4 paintings
- Drouais, François-Hubert – 1 painting
- Fragonard, Jean-Honoré – 2 paintings
- Gauguin, Paul – 2 paintings
- Gobert, Pierre – 1 painting
- Ingres, Jean-Auguste-Dominique – 3 paintings
- Lemoyne, François – 1 painting
- Léger, Fernand – 1 painting
- Manet, Édouard – 4 paintings
- Matisse, Henry – 2 paintings
- Mignard, Pierre (and workshop) – 1 painting
- Modigliani, Amedeo – 5 paintings
- Monet, Claude – 2 paintings, including Boating on the River Epte
- Nattier, Jean-Marc – 4 paintings
- Pater, Jean-Baptiste – 1 painting
- Picasso, Pablo Ruiz – 3 paintings, including Portrait of Suzanne Bloch
- Poussin, Nicolas – 1 painting
- Renoir, Pierre-Auguste – 12 paintings, including Pink and Blue
- de Toulouse-Lautrec, Henri – 10 paintings
- Vestier, Antoine – 1 painting
- Vuillard, Édouard – 3 paintings

Spanish school

- El Greco (Domenikos Theotokopoulos) – 2 paintings
- Goya y Lucientes, Francisco – 4 paintings
- Murillo, Bartolomé Esteban – 1 painting
- Velázquez, Diego Rodríguez de Silva y – 1 painting, the Portrait of the Count-Duke of Olivares
- Zurbarán, Francisco de – 2 paintings

Dutch, Flemish and German schools

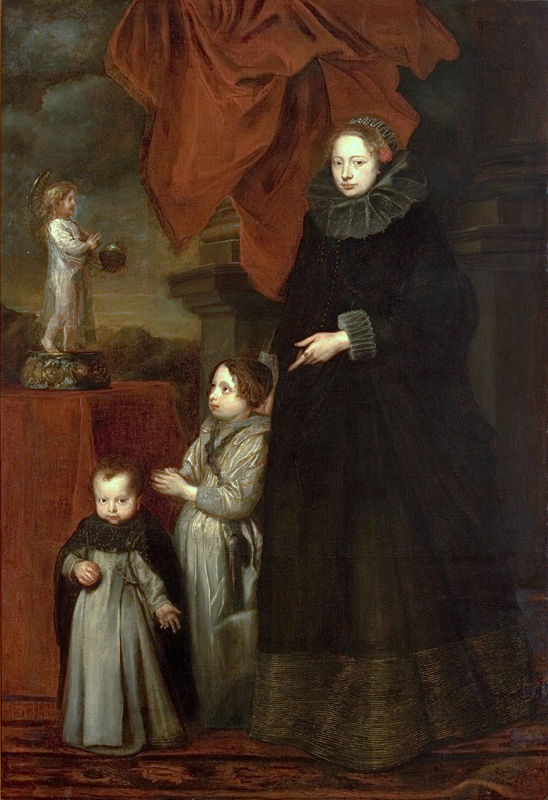
Van Dyck (Flemish, 1599–1641) Marquise Paola Lomellini Doria with her Children, c.1623.

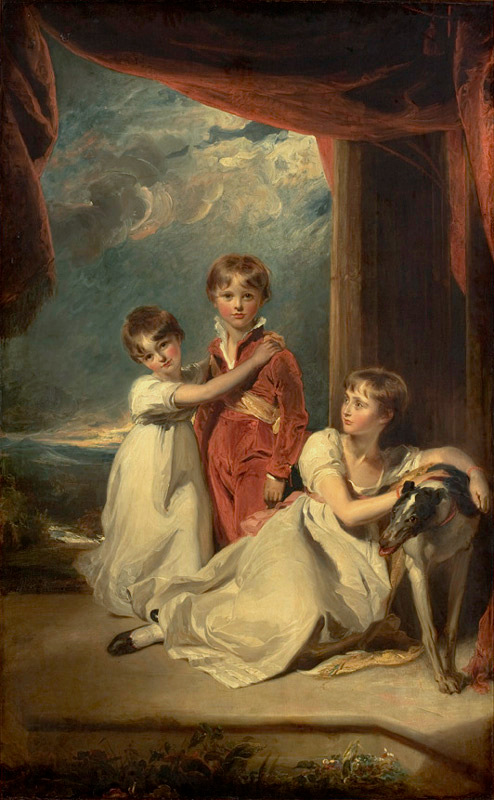
Thomas Lawrence (British, 1769–1830) The sons of Sir Samuel Fludyer, 1806.

- Bosch, Hieronymus – 1 painting
- Cranach, Lucas (the Elder) – 1 painting
- Dornicke, Jan van – 1 painting
- Dyck, Anthony van – 2 paintings
- Hals, Frans – 3 paintings
- Holbein, Hans (the Younger) – 1 painting
- Massys, Quentin – 1 painting, Ill-Matched Marriage
- Memling, Hans – 1 painting
- Oolen, Jan van – 1 painting
- Post, Frans – 5 paintings
- Rembrandt – 1 painting, Portrait of a Young Man with a Golden Chain
- Rubens, Peter Paul(and workshop) – 1 painting
- Ruysdael, Salomon van – 1 painting
- Van Gogh, Vincent – 5 paintings

English school

- Constable, John – 1 painting
- Gainsborough, Thomas – 3 paintings
- Hogarth, William – 1 painting
- Lawrence, Thomas (and workshop) – 2 paintings
- Raeburn, Henry – 1 painting
- Reynolds, Joshua – 1 painting
- Romney, George – 1 painting
- Turner, J. M. W. – 1 painting

The museum also has some small collections of photographs, costumes and textiles, kitsch objects, etc.

== Claims for Nazi-looted art ==
The museum faces controversy regarding five sculptures by Edgar Degas which are claimed by the family of Alfred Flechtheim who alleges they were stolen by the Nazis during World War II.

== Theft ==
On 20 December 2007, around 5:09 am, three men broke in to MASP and stole two paintings considered to be among the most valuable pieces in the museum's collection: O Lavrador de Café (The Coffee Farmer) by Cândido Portinari, and the Portrait of Suzanne Bloch by Pablo Picasso. It took the perpetrators just three minutes in total to successfully carry out the heist, using a hydraulic jack and a crowbar. Art experts estimated the value of the paintings to be around $55–56 million in U.S. dollars. Both pieces were recovered by the Brazilian police a few weeks after they were stolen, on 8 January 2008, in the city of Ferraz de Vasconcelos, in Greater São Paulo. Two suspects were arrested, although the Brazilian Minister of Culture, Gilberto Gil, speculated that the thieves were "linked to international gangs."

The incident was described as "a major embarrassment" for the museum, which was revealed to have "no alarm system and no sensors. Video security cameras captured some of the raid but, since it had no infrared capability, the images were obscure." Additionally, none of the museum's collection was insured. MASP's president, Julio Neves, stated that they did not have the resources to finance a modern security system, and that they had instead "opted for security by patrolling, with people and cameras"; he promised improvements in light to the incident. Just two months before the robbery, "two thieves tried to break into the museum but were spotted and fled", and in 2005, MASP was forced to close temporarily "when its power was cut off for nonpayment of bills."

== Gallery ==
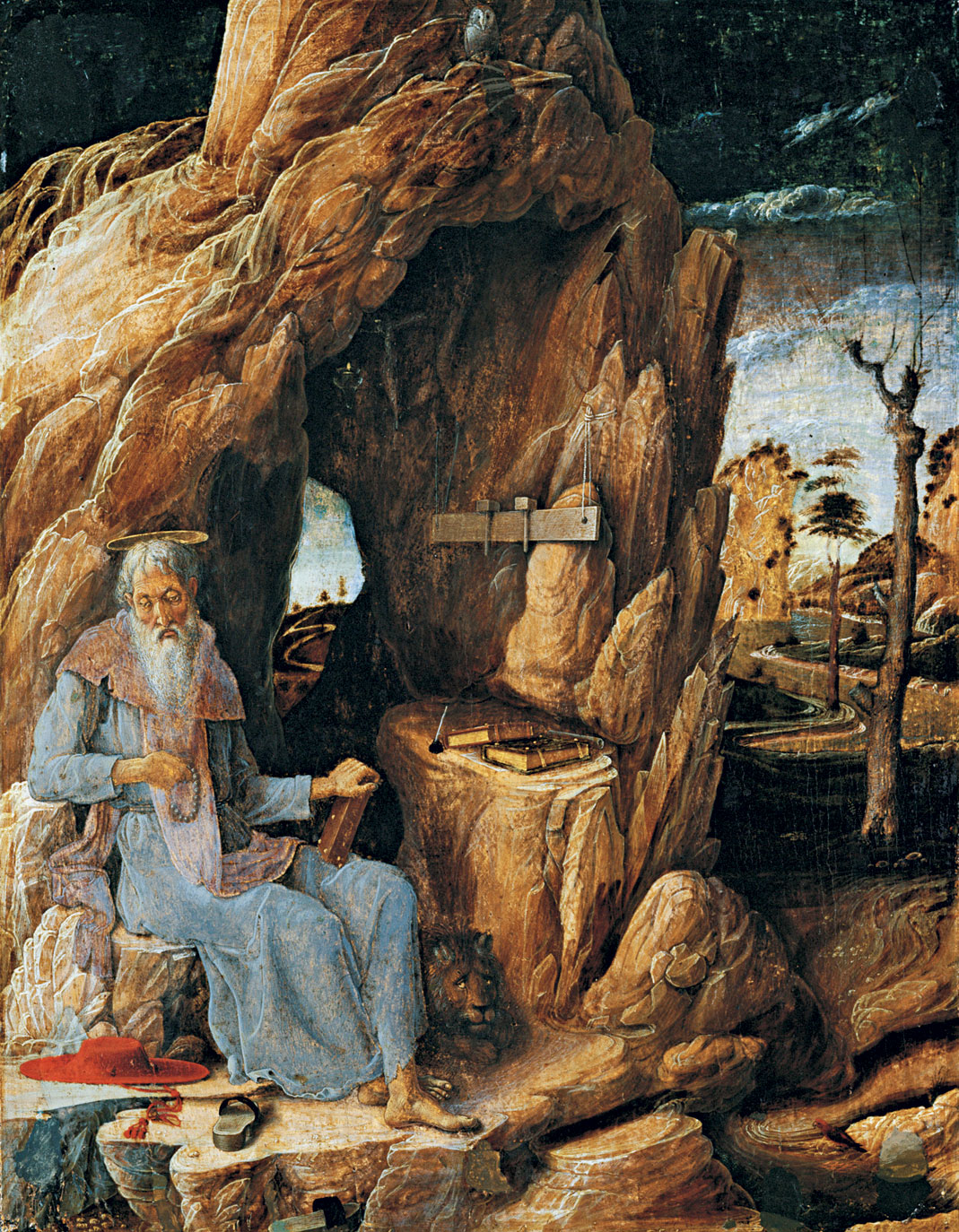
Andrea Mantegna Saint Jerome in the Wilderness, 1448–51

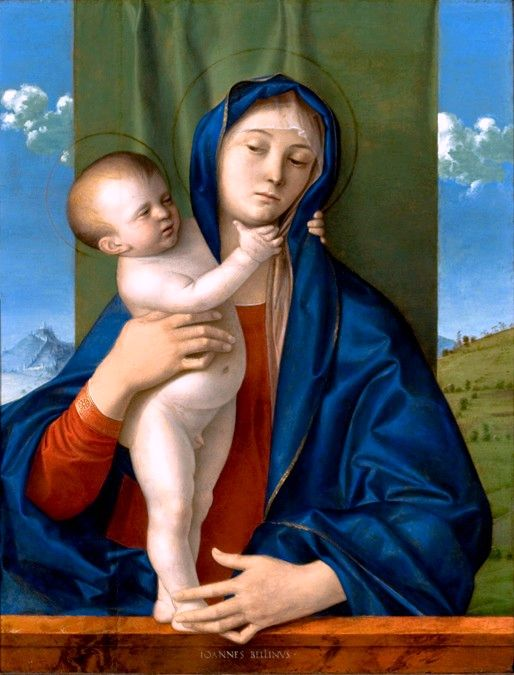
Giovanni Bellini Willys Madonna, 1480-90

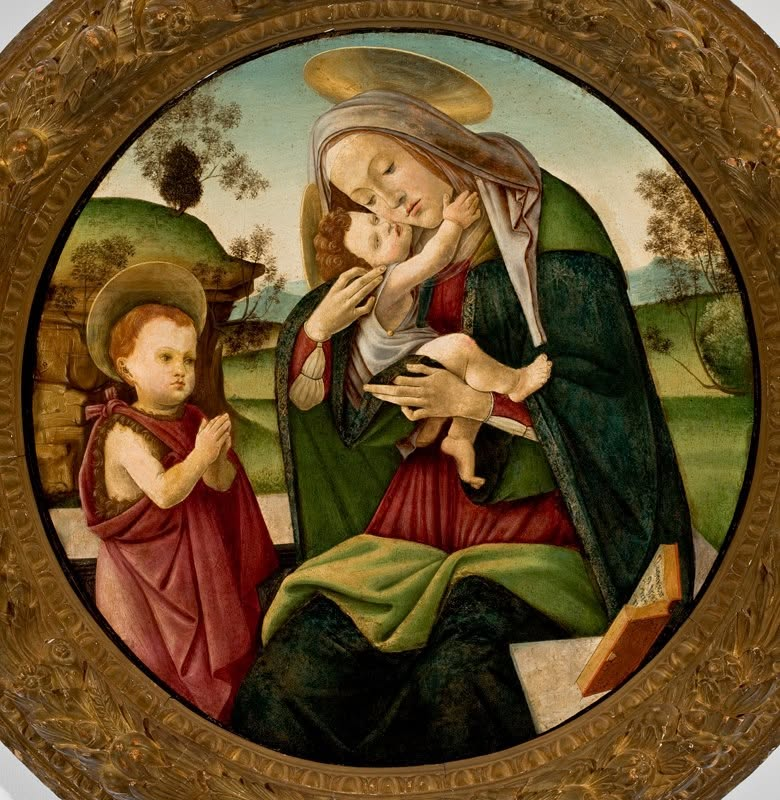
Botticelli and Workshop Virgin and Child, 1490-1500

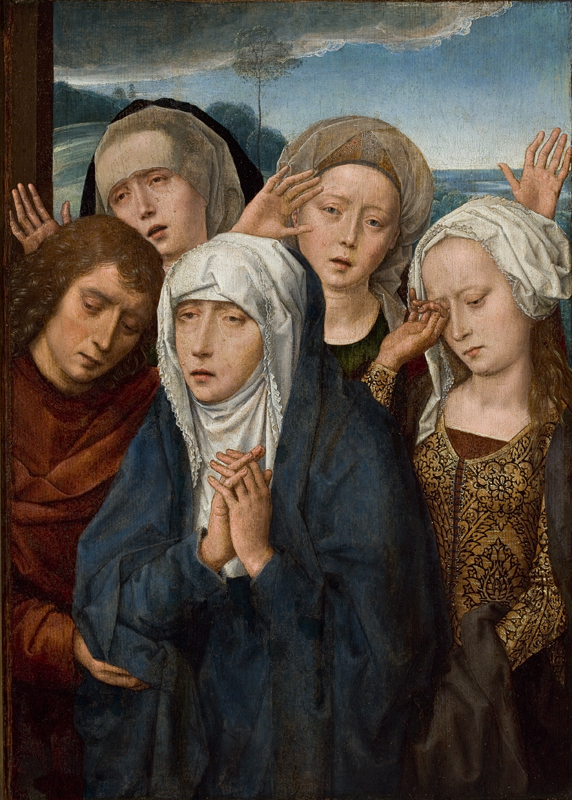
Hans Memling The Virgin Lamenting, 1485-90

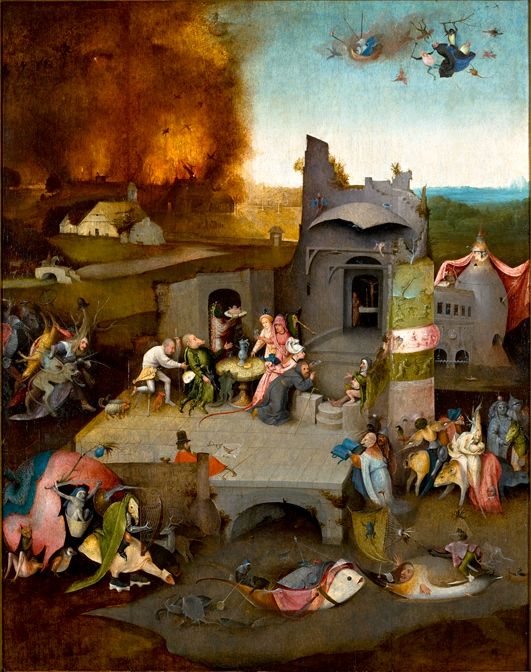
Hieronymus Bosch The Temptations of St. Anthony, 1500

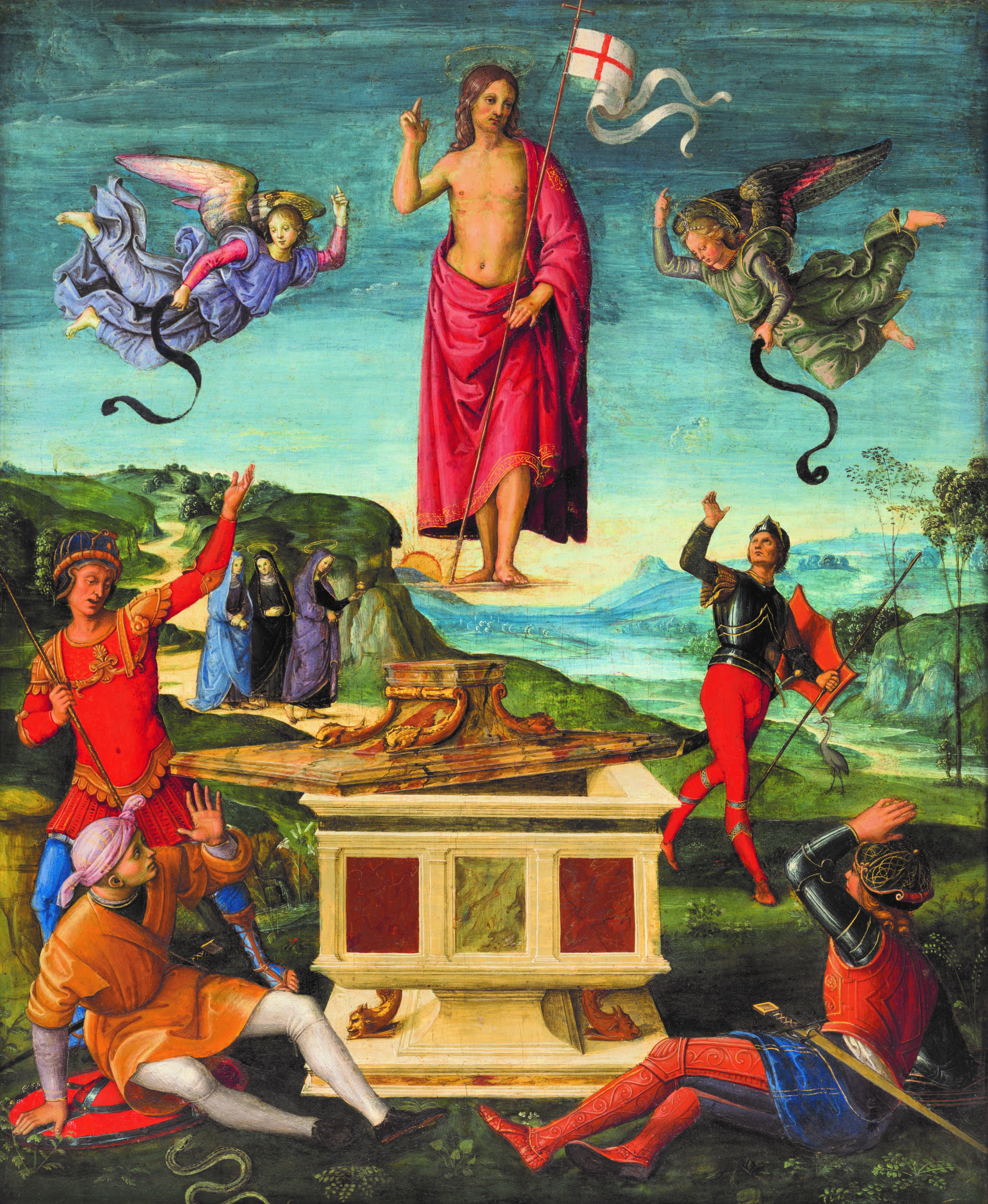
Raphael Resurrection of Christ, 1499-1502

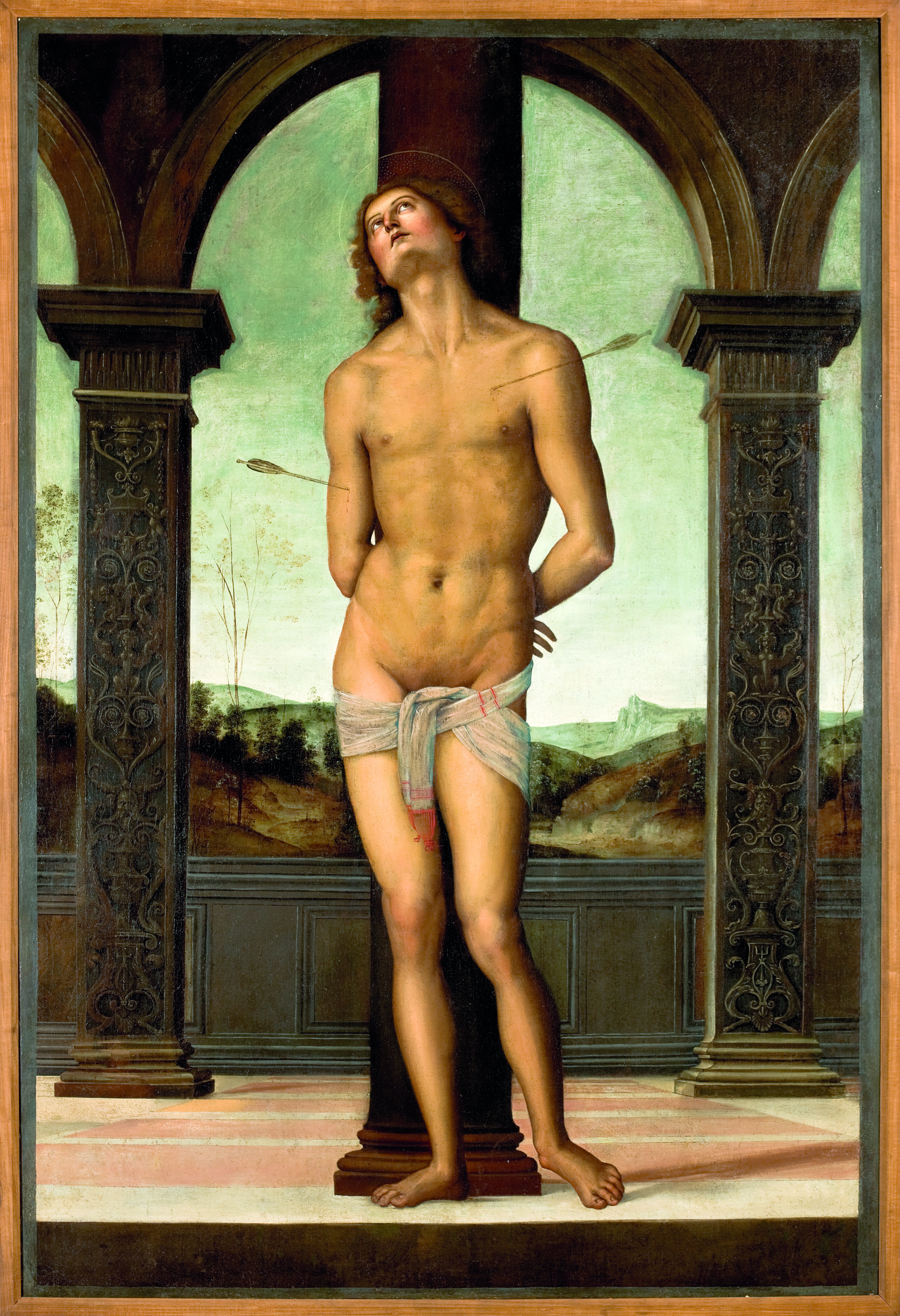
Pietro Perugino and Workhop St. Sebastian, 1500-10

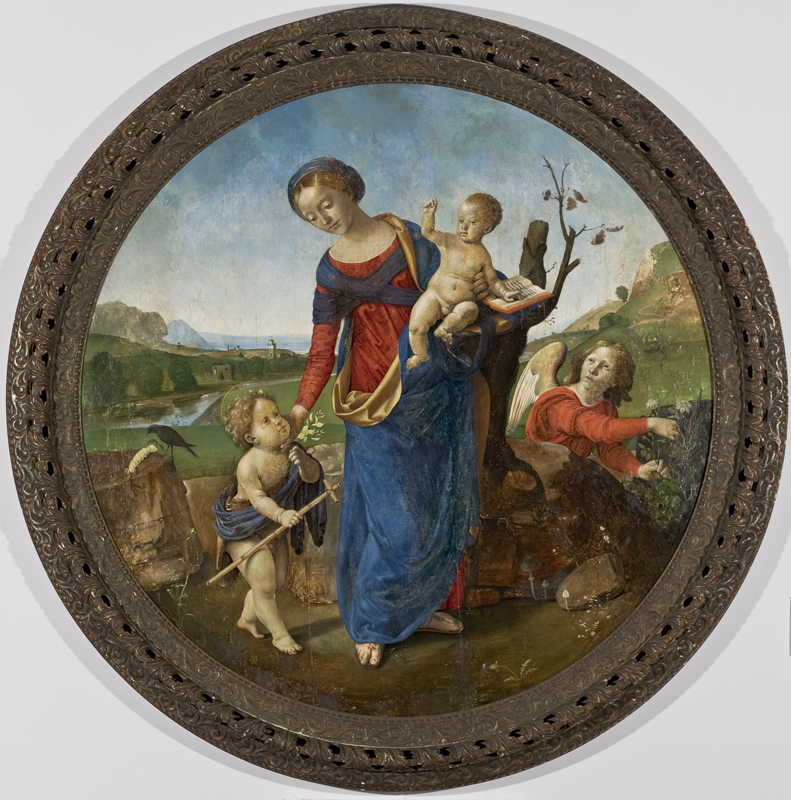
Piero di Cosimo Virgin and Child, 1500-10

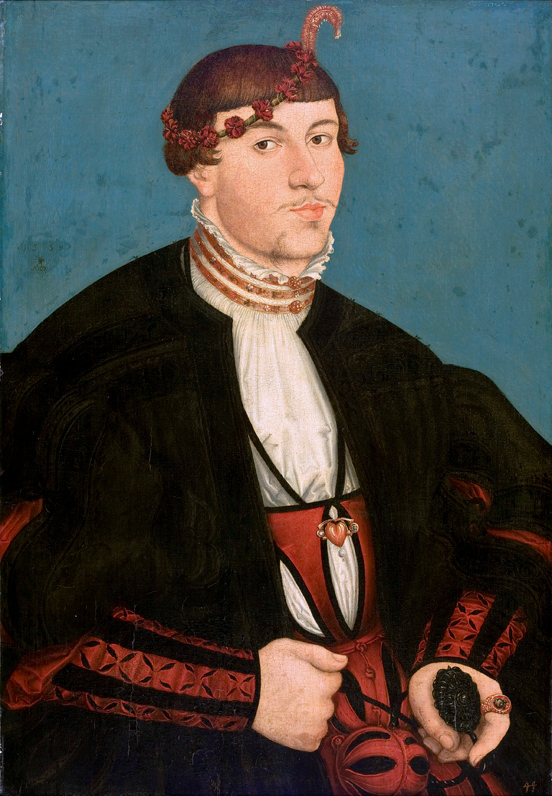
Lucas Cranach the Elder Portrait of a Young Aristocrat, 1539

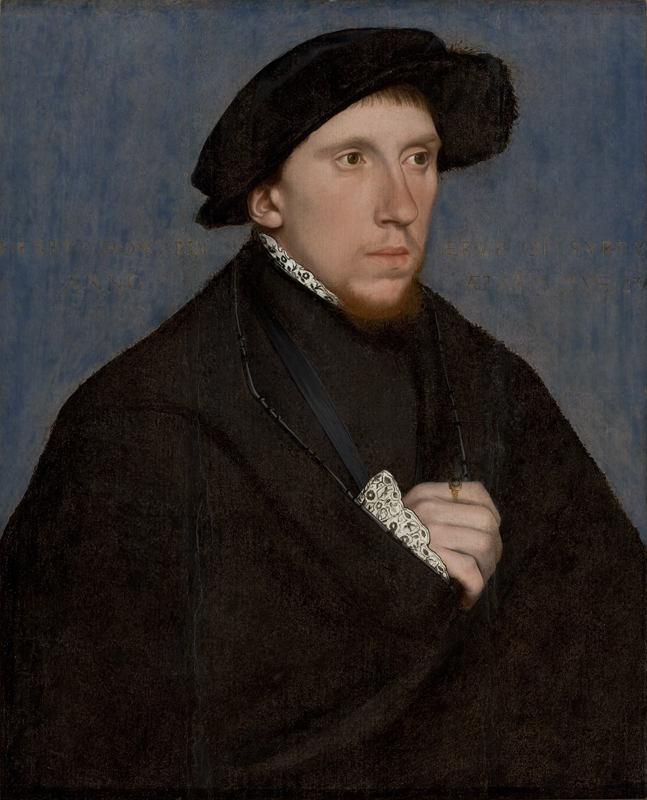
Hans Holbein the Younger The Poet Henry Howard, 1542

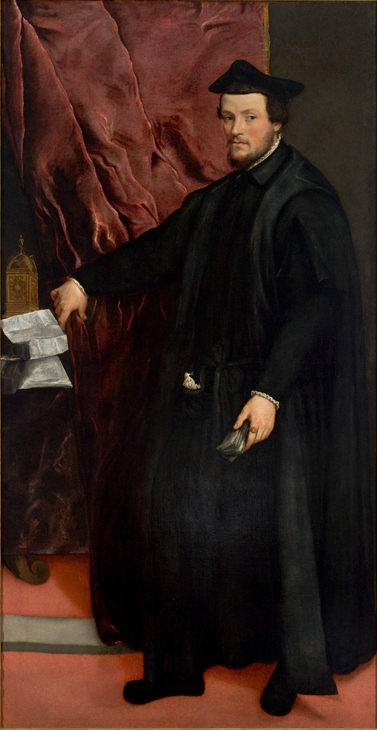
Titian Portrait of Cardinal Madruzzo, 1552

Tintoretto Pietà, 1560-65

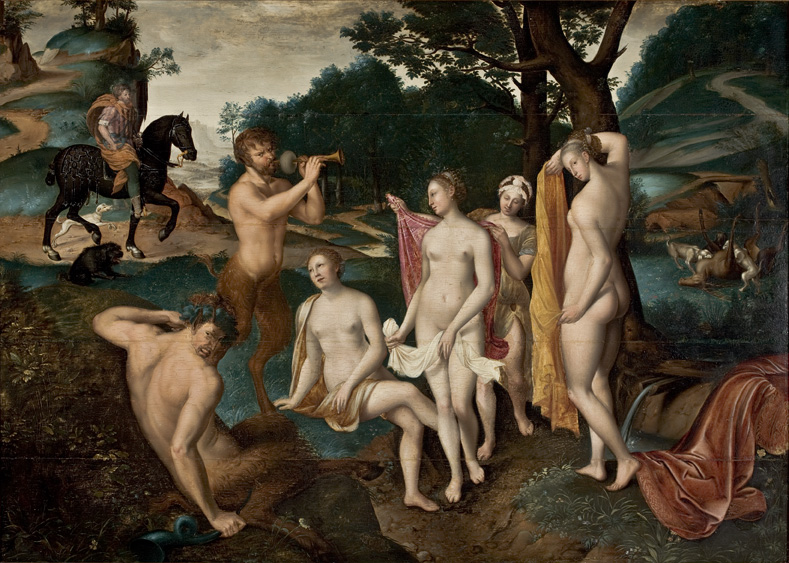
François Clouet Diana's Bath, 1559-60

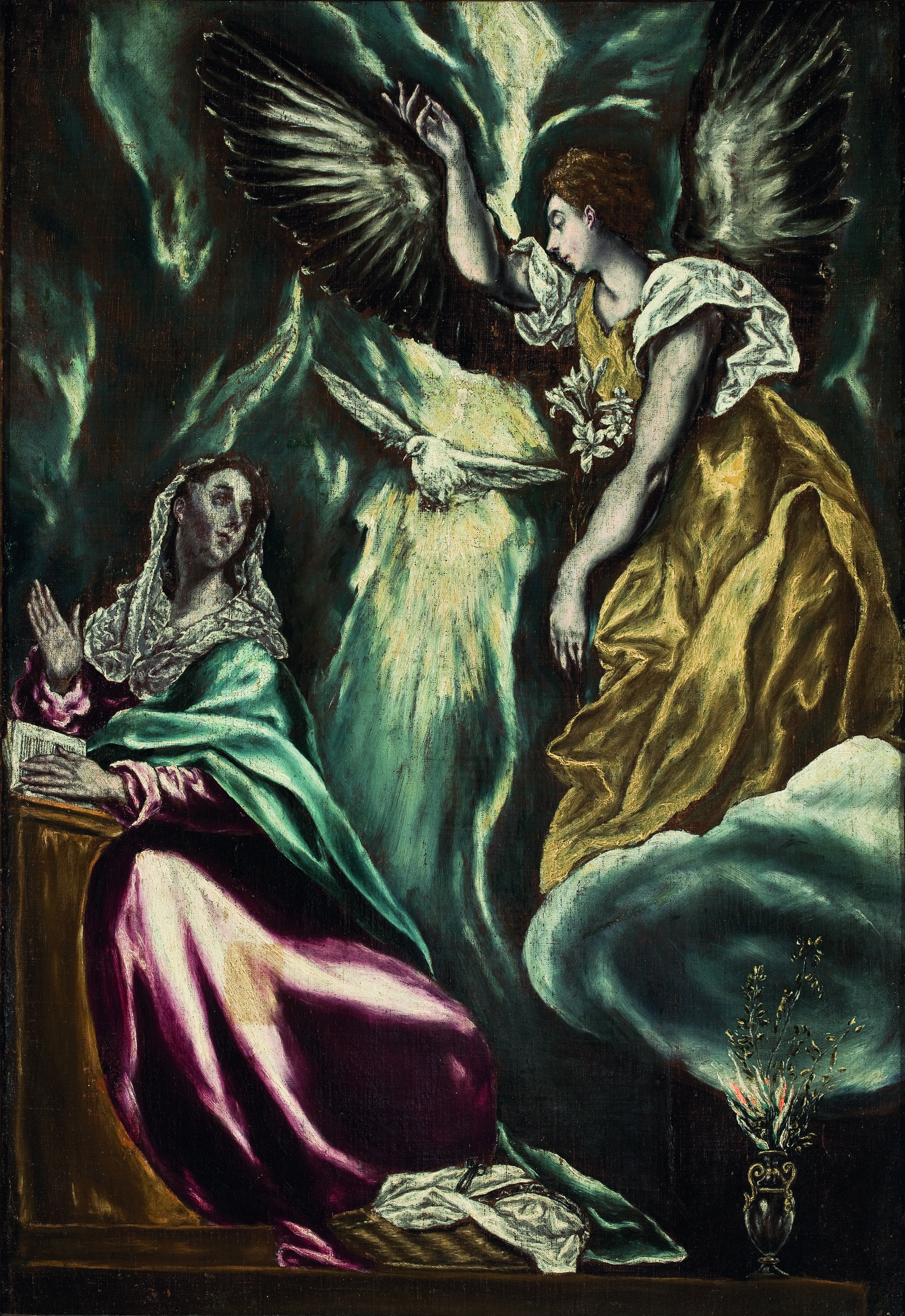
El Greco The Annunciation, 1600

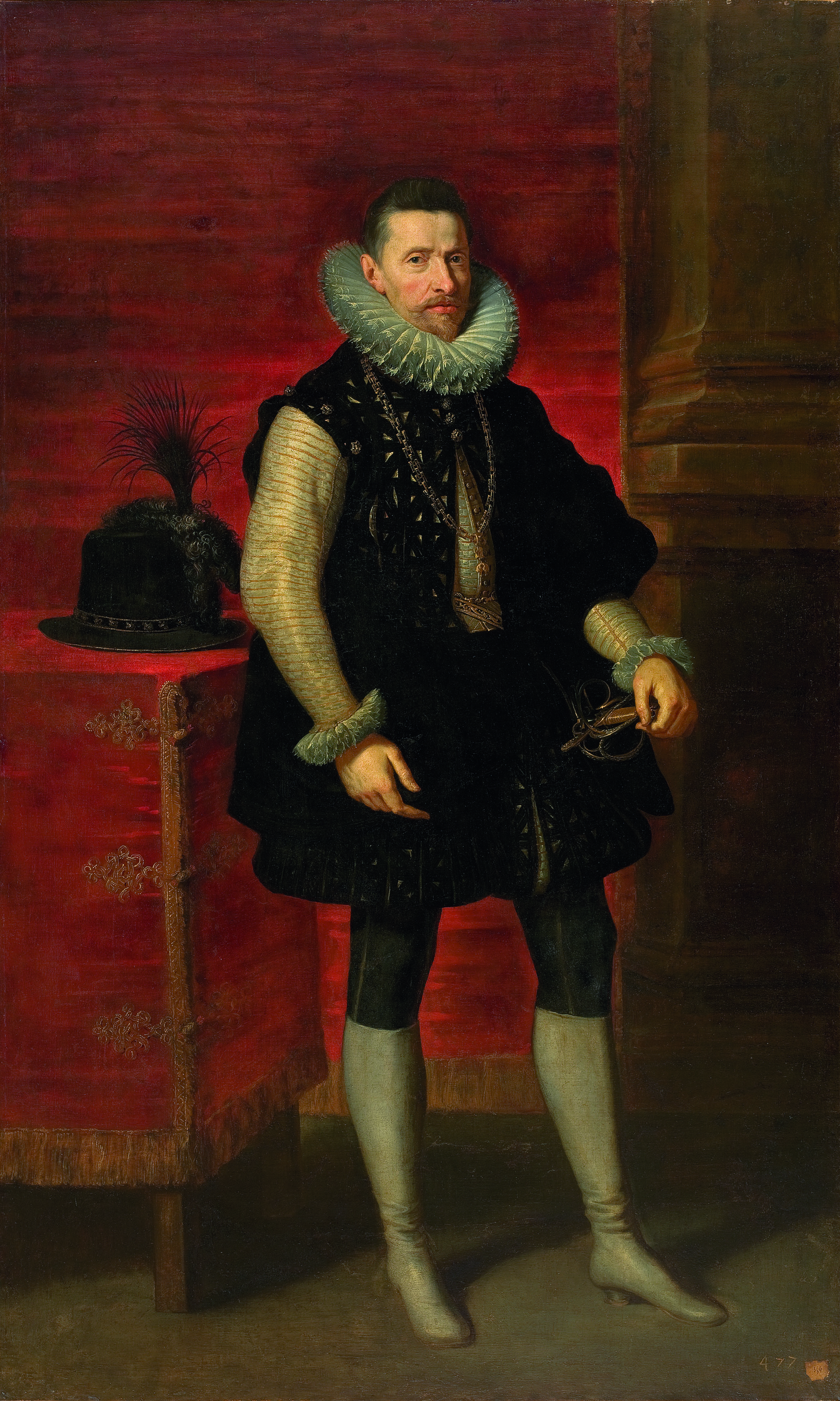
Rubens The Archduke Albert VII, 1615

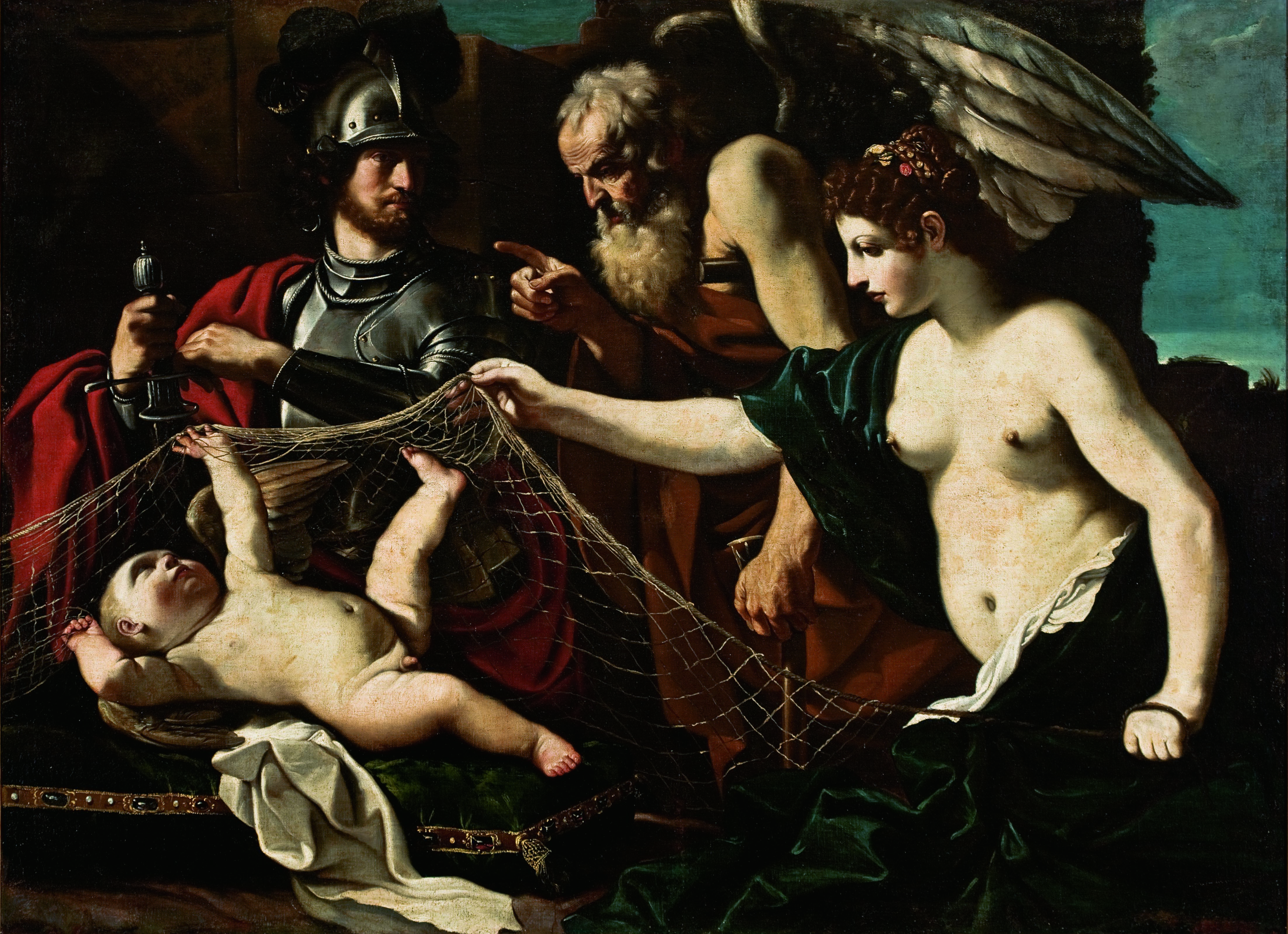
Guercino Mythological Scene, 1624

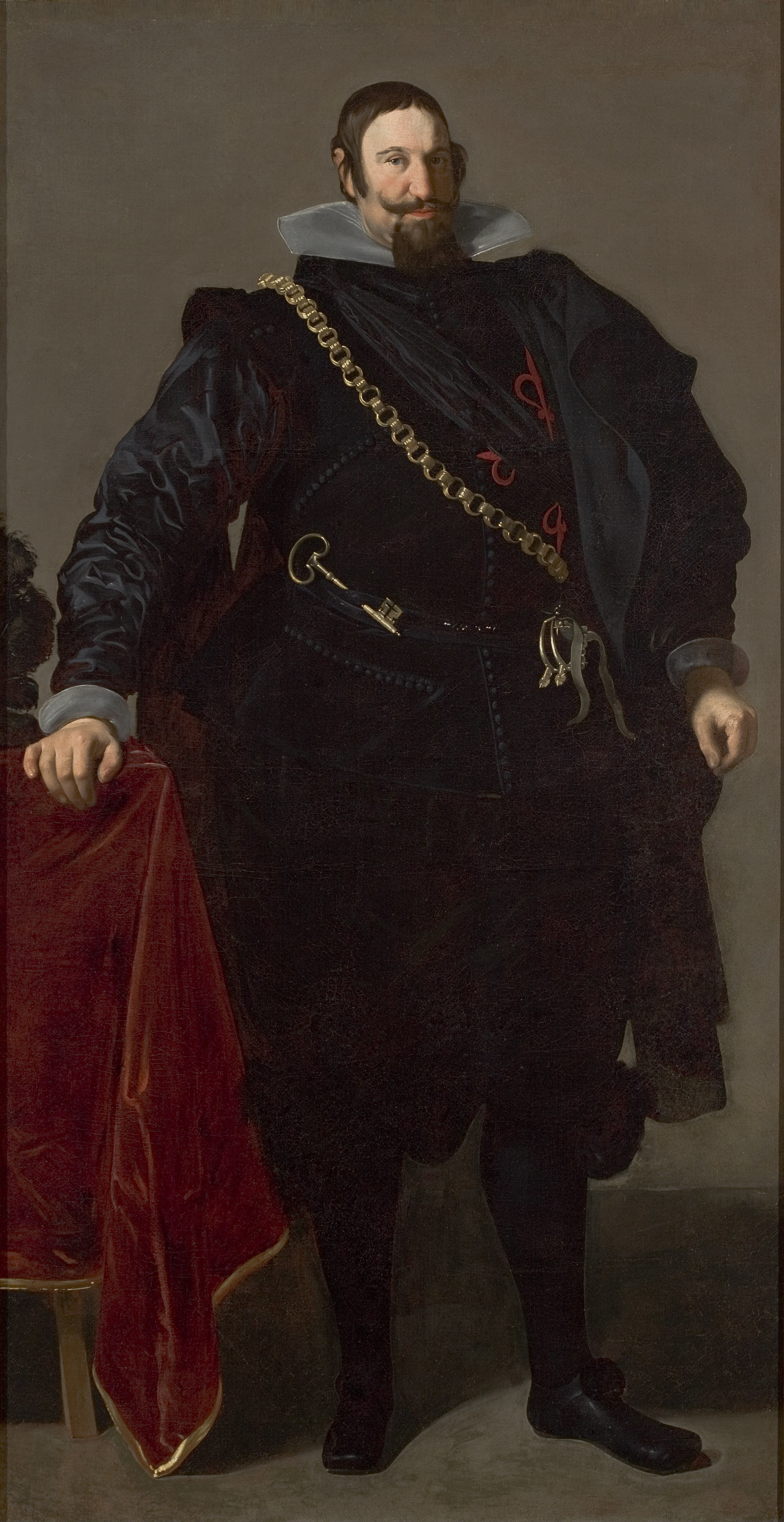
Velázquez Count-Duke of Olivares, 1624

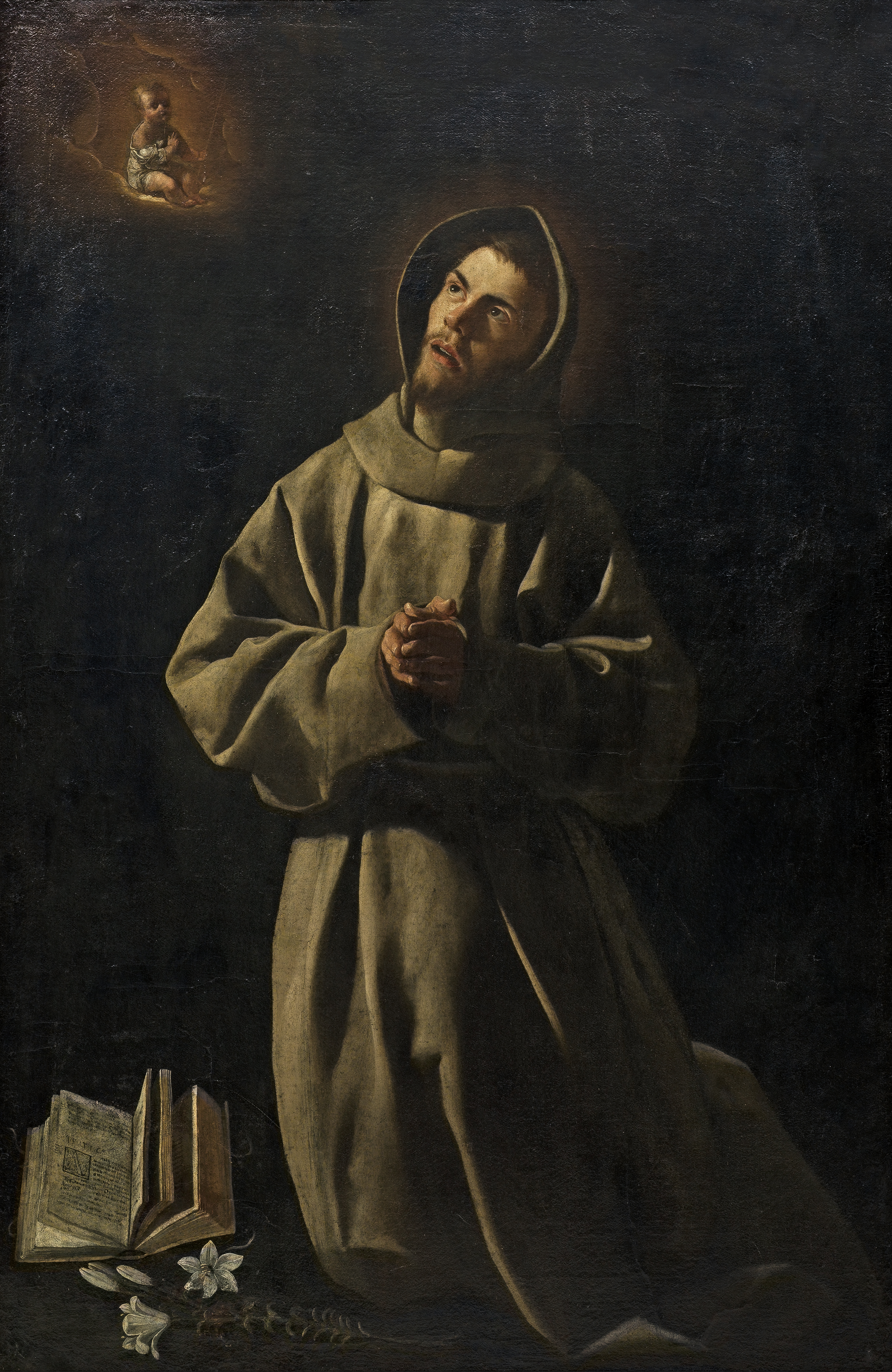
Zurbarán St. Anthony of Padua, 1627

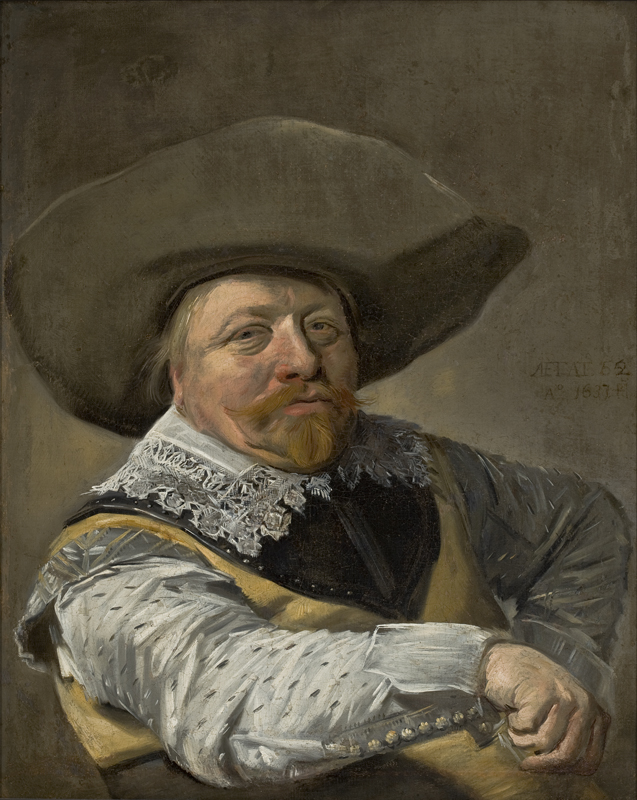
Frans Hals Seated Officer, 1631

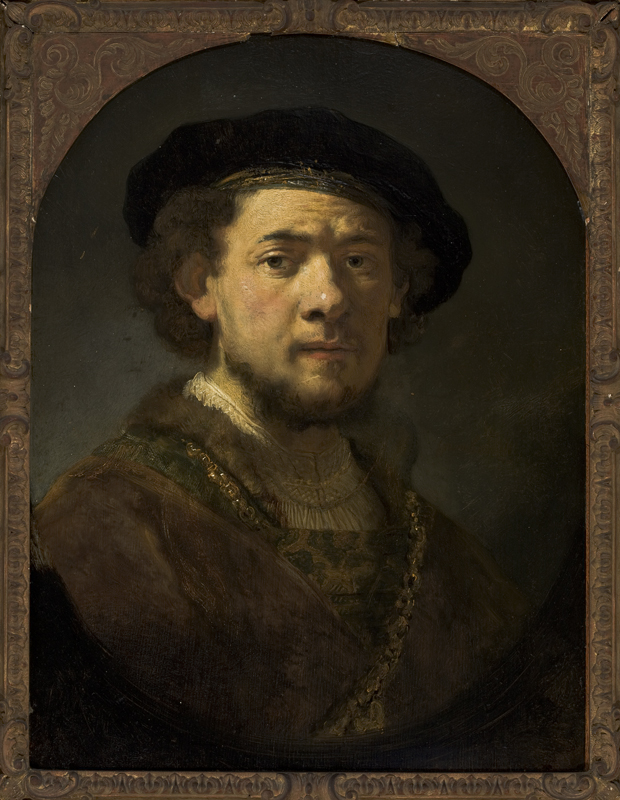
Rembrandt and Workshop Portrait of a Young Man, 1635

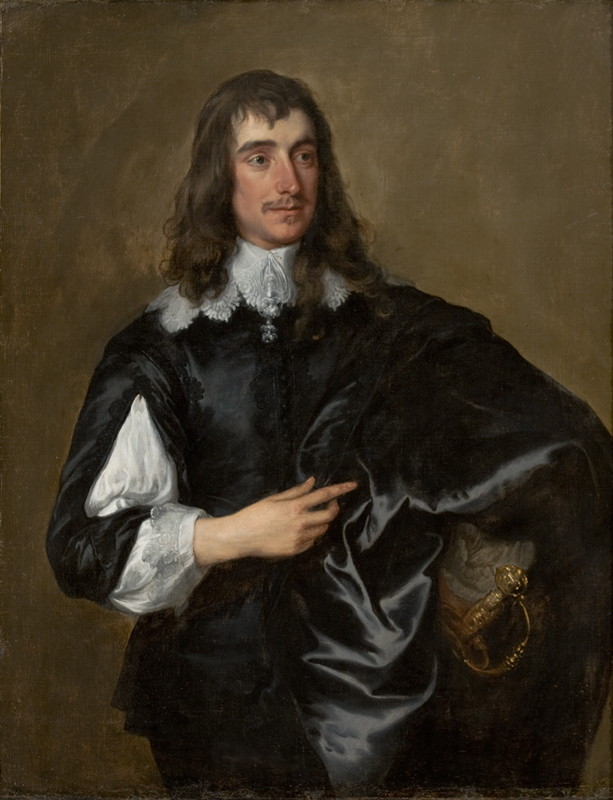
Anthony van Dyck Portrait of William Howard, 1640

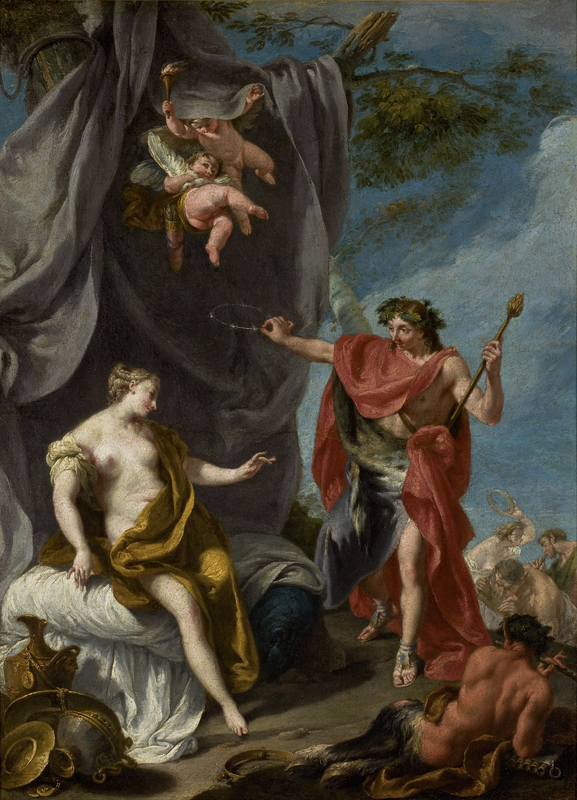
Giambattista Pittoni Dionysius and Ariadne, 1730-35

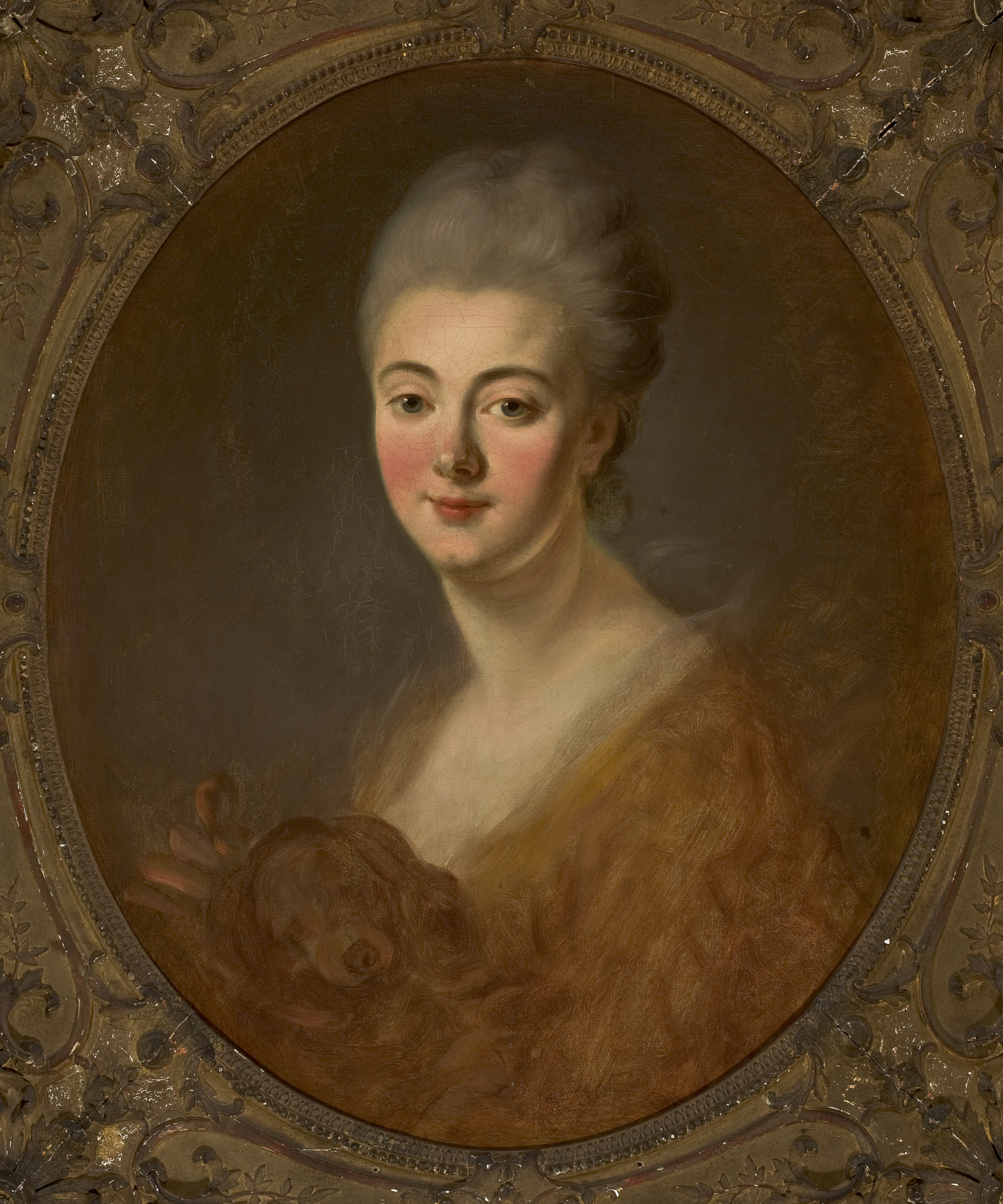
Fragonard Elisabeth-Sophie-Constance de Lowendhal, 1775

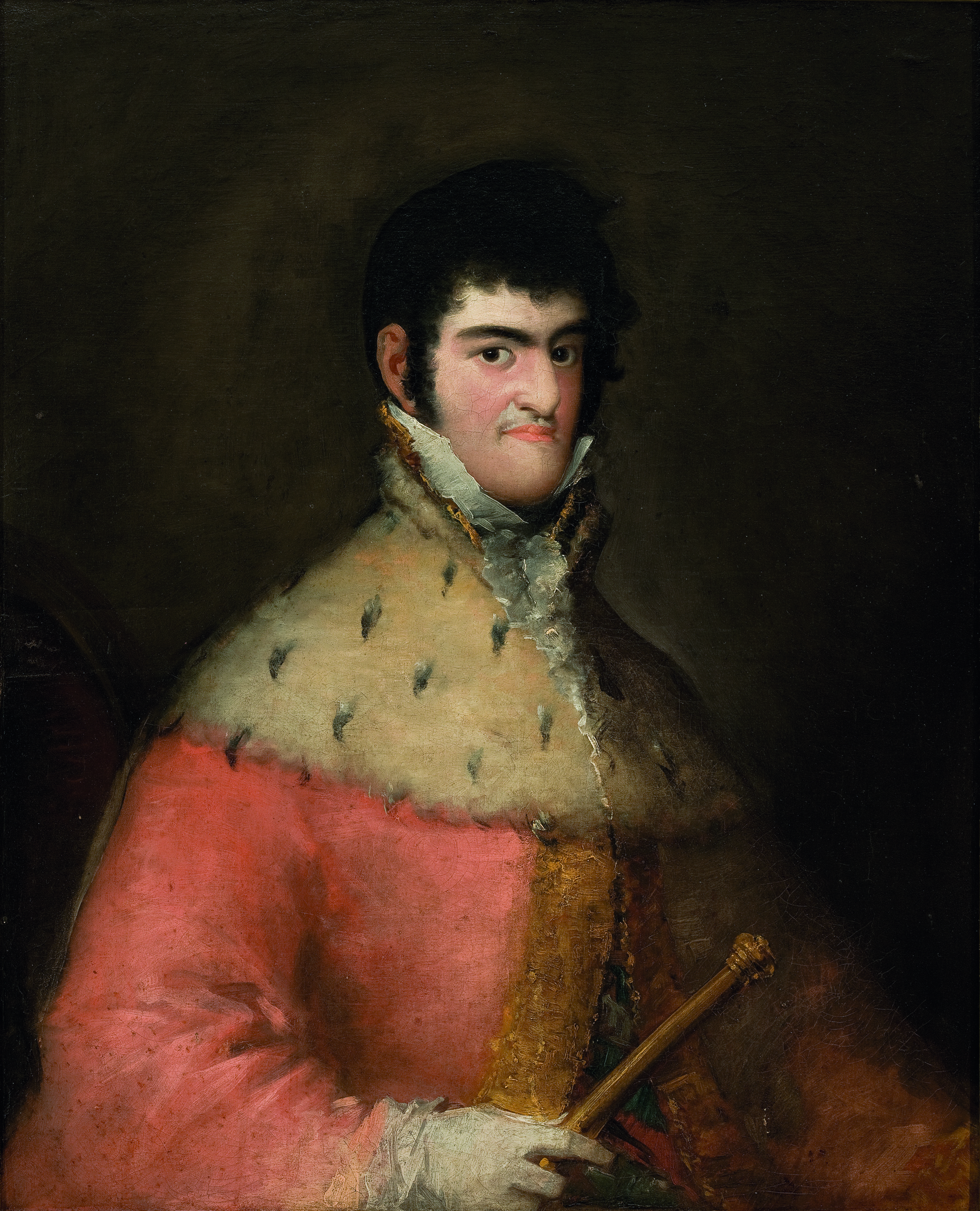
Goya Portrait of Ferdinand VII, 1808

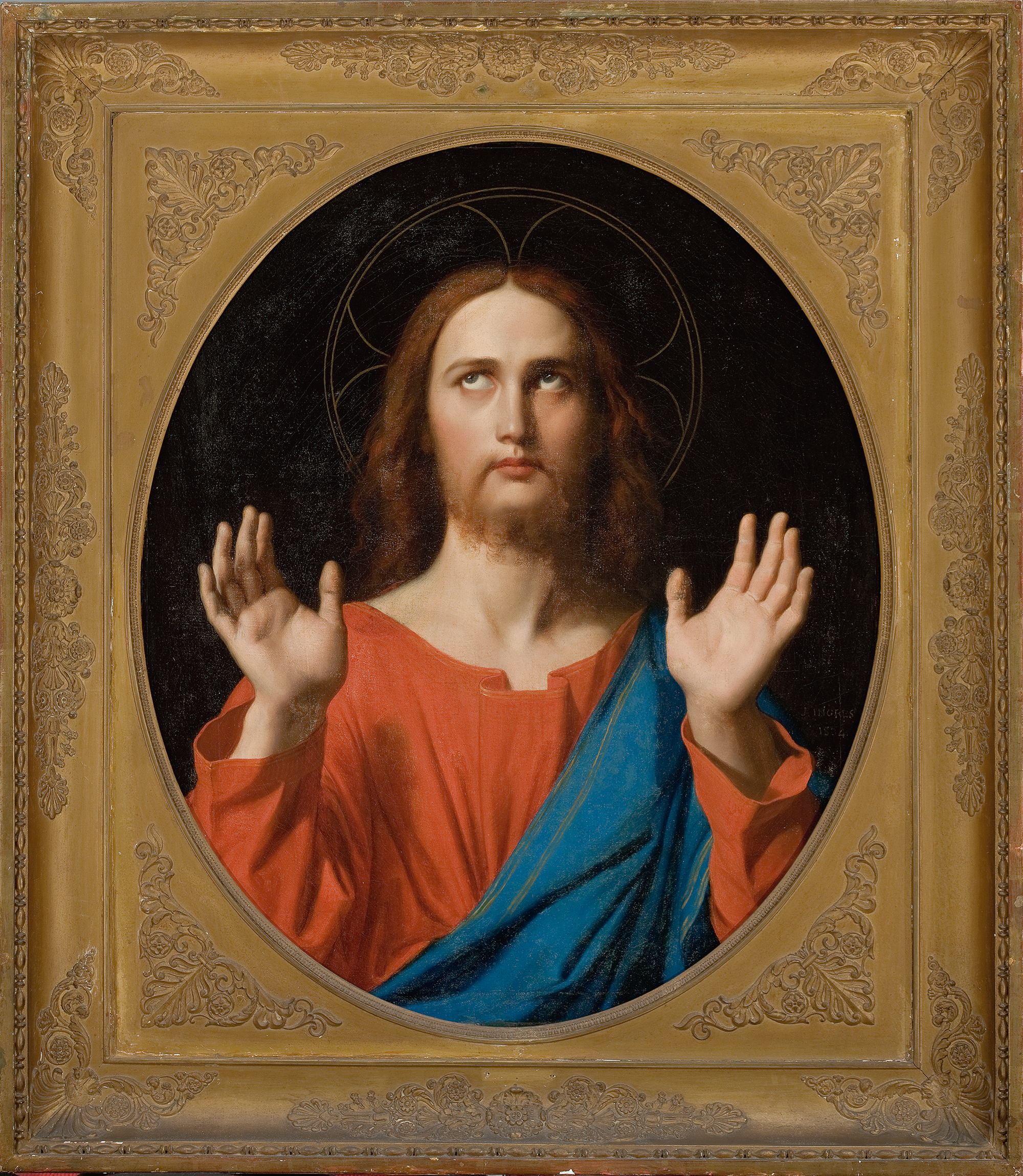
Ingres The Blessing Christ, 1834

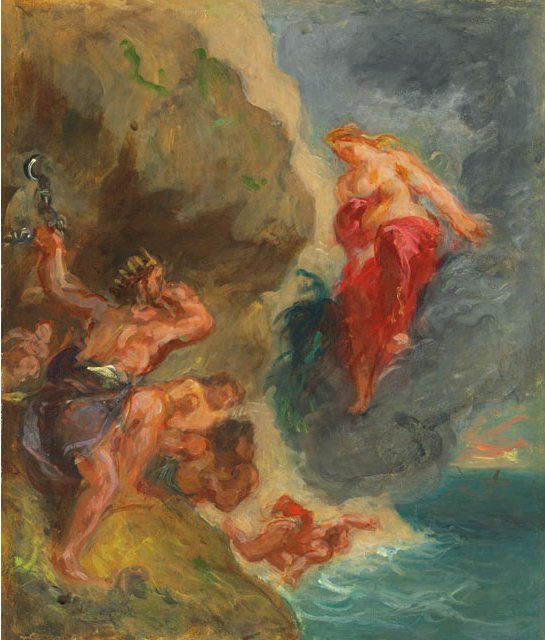
Eugène Delacroix The Winter, 1856-63

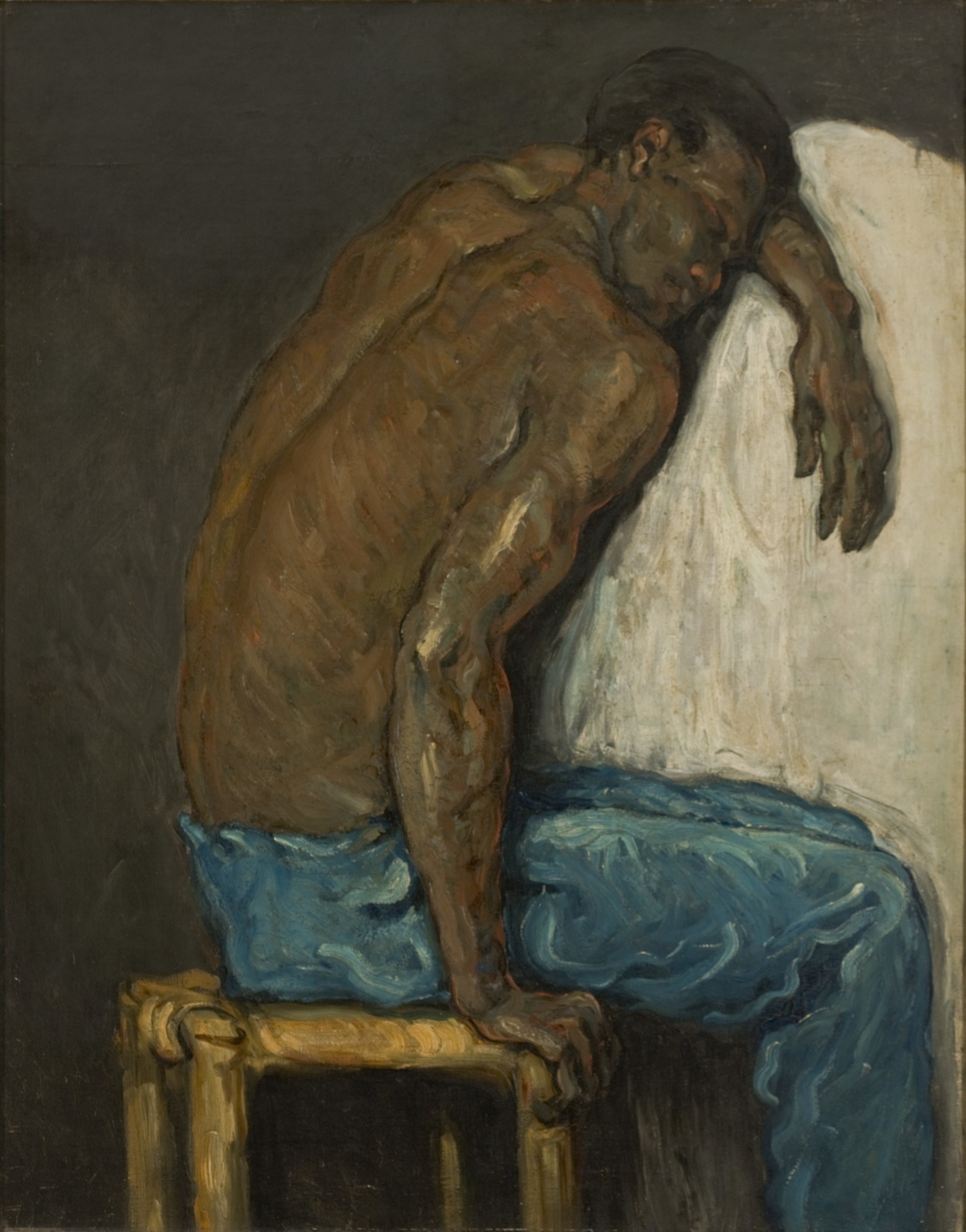
Paul Cézanne The Negro Scipion, 1867

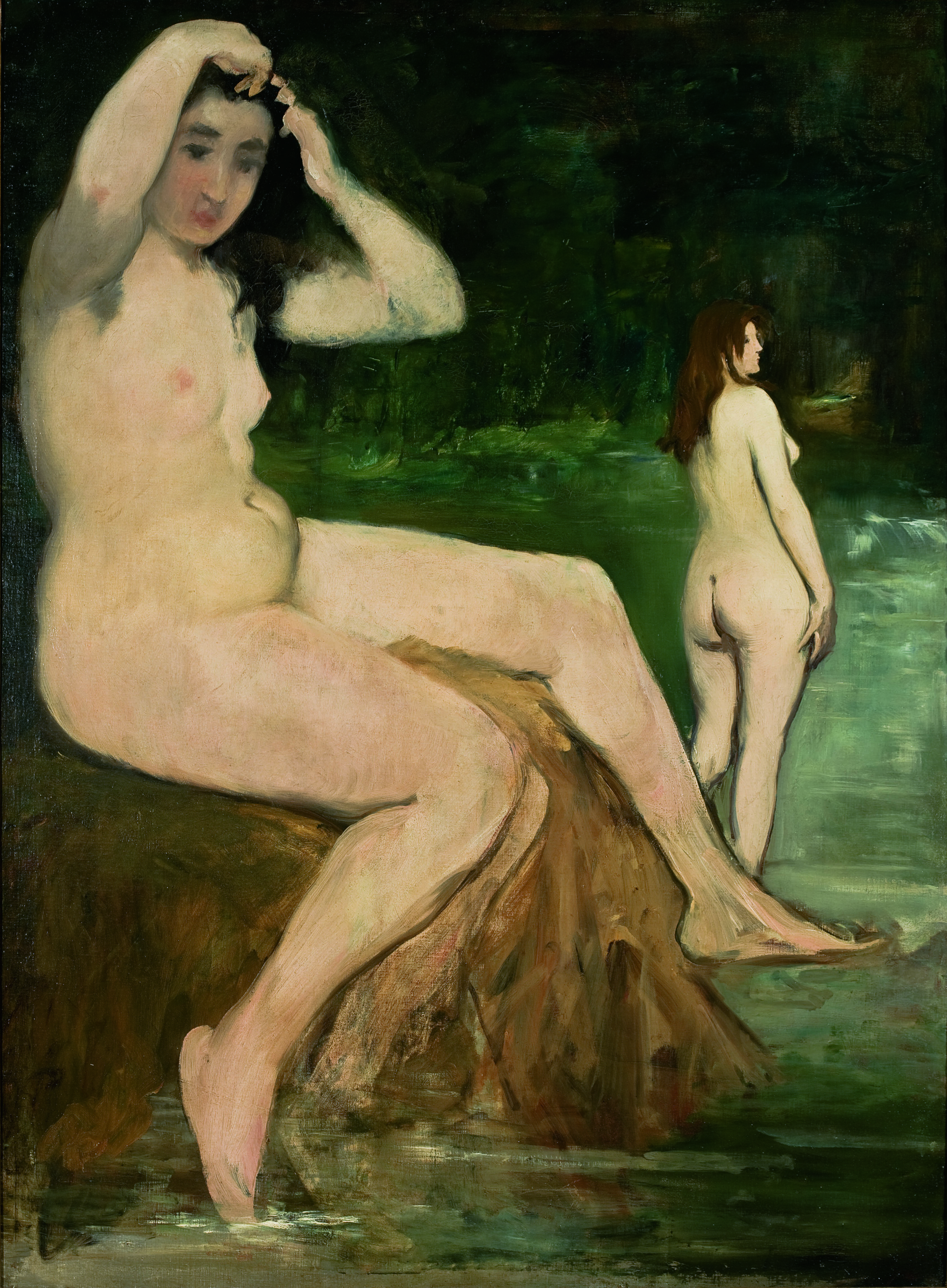
Édouard Manet Bathers on the Seine 1874-76

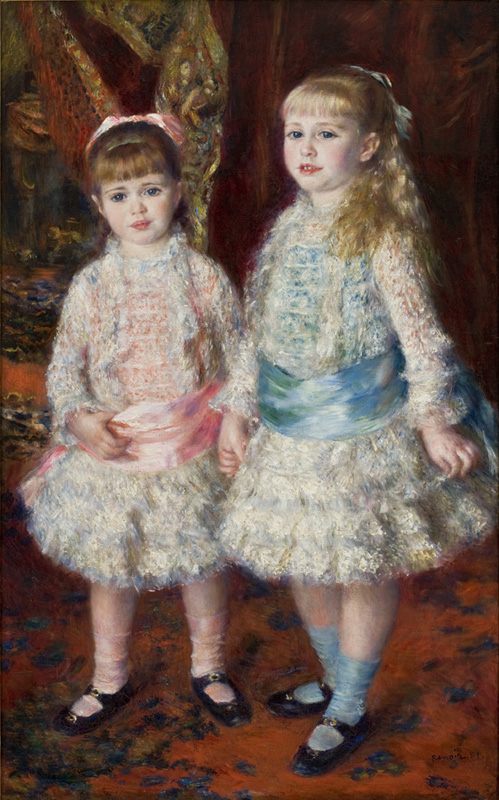
Renoir Pink and Blue, 1881

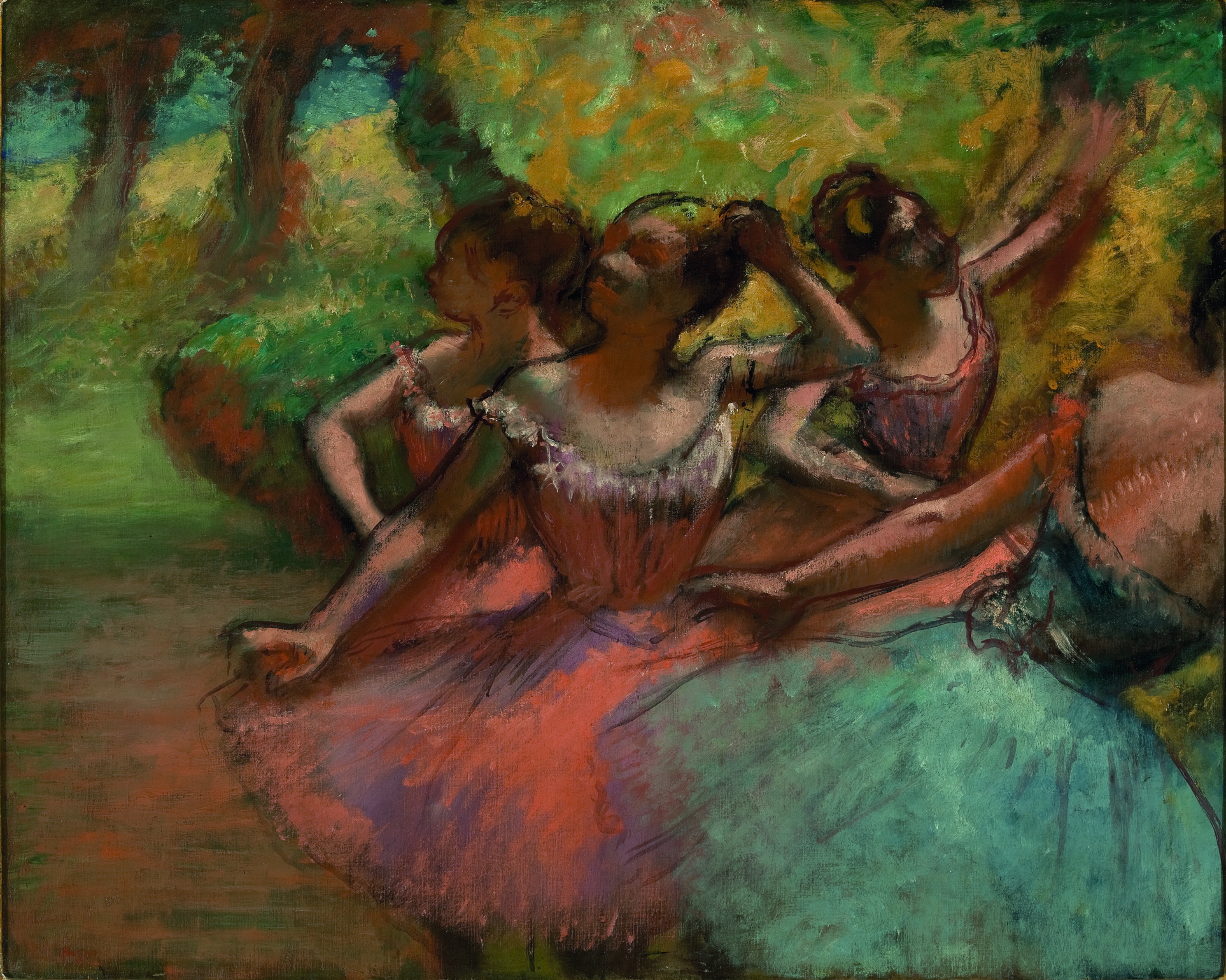
Edgar Degas Four Ballet Dancers on Stage, 1885-90

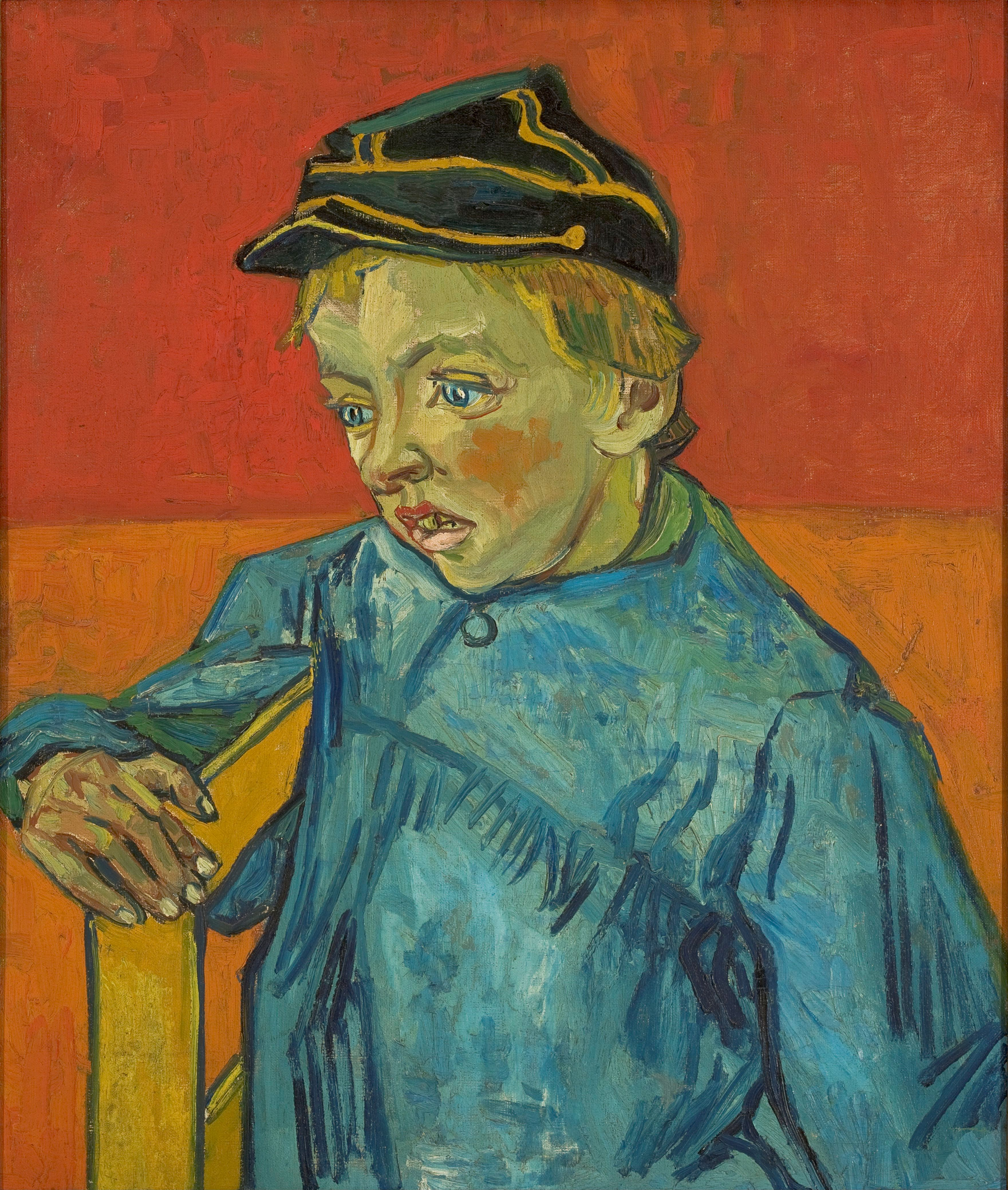
Vincent van Gogh The Schoolboy, 1888

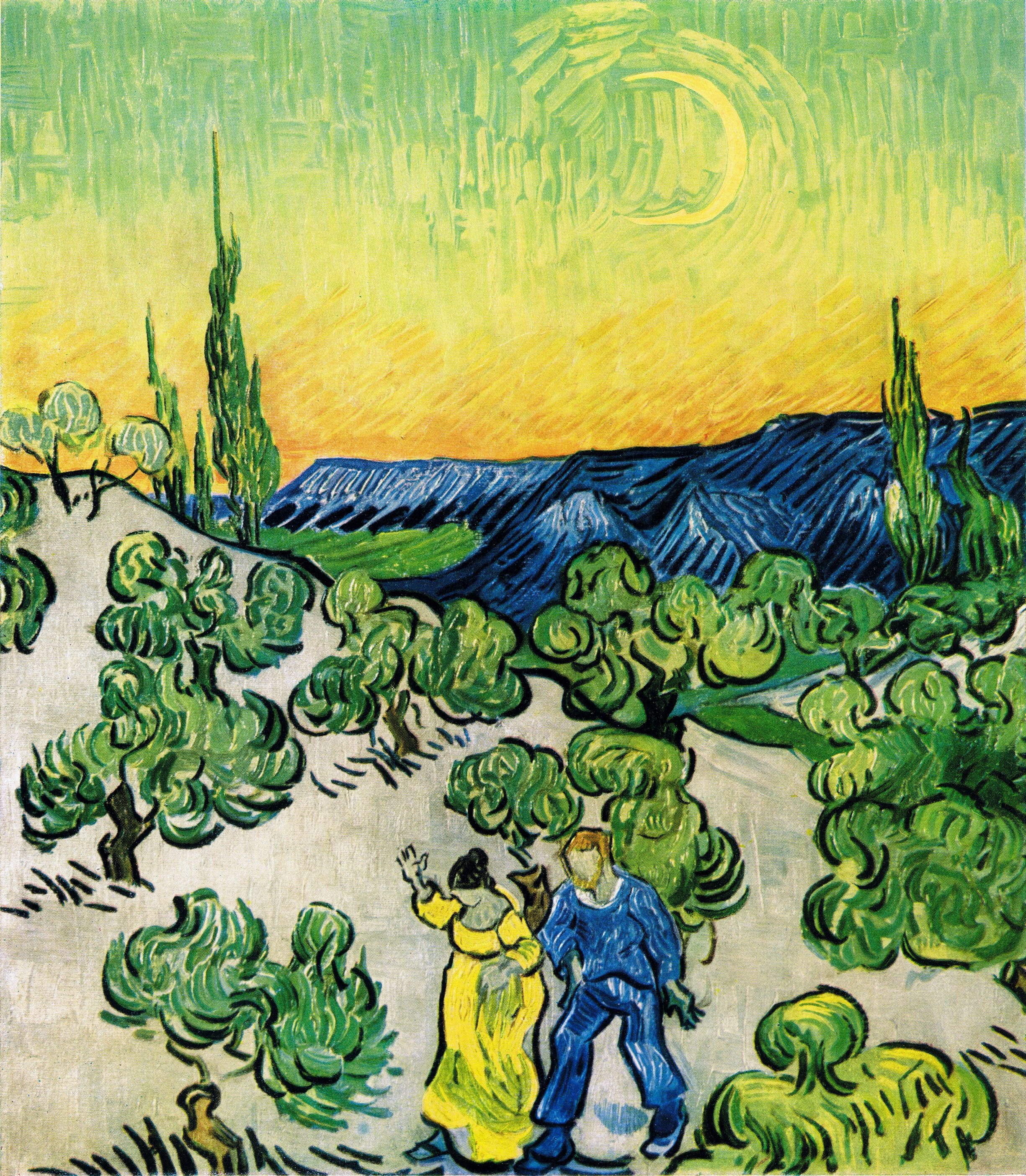
Vincent van Gogh Sunset walk, 1890

Claude Monet The Canoe on the Epte, 1890

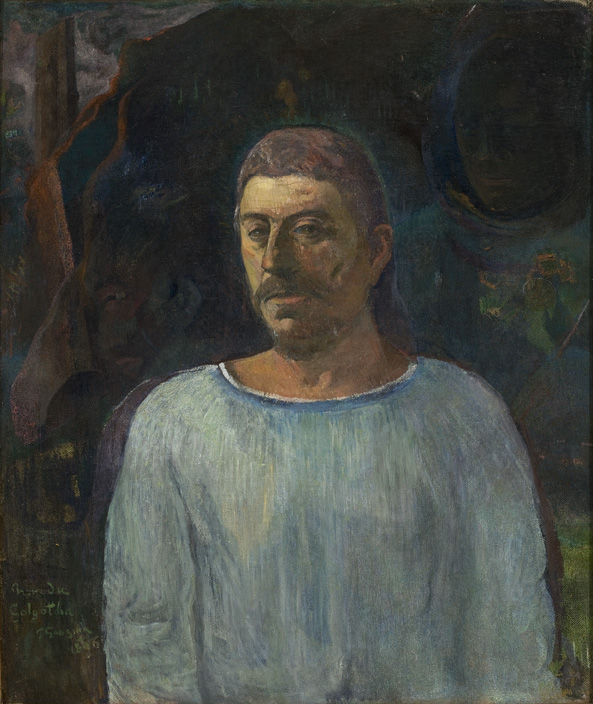
Paul Gauguin Self-portrait, 1896

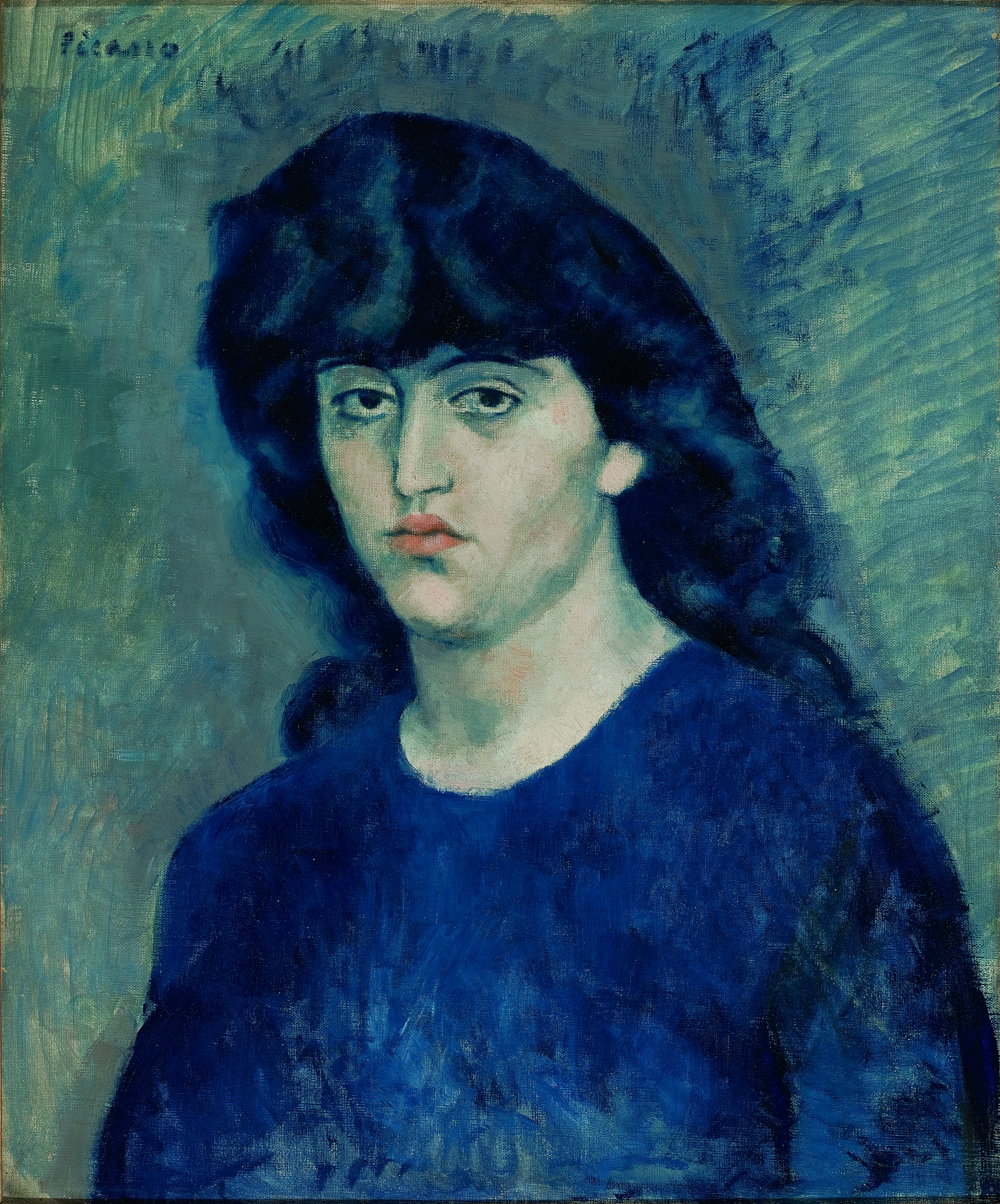
Pablo Picasso Portrait of Suzanne Bloch, 1904

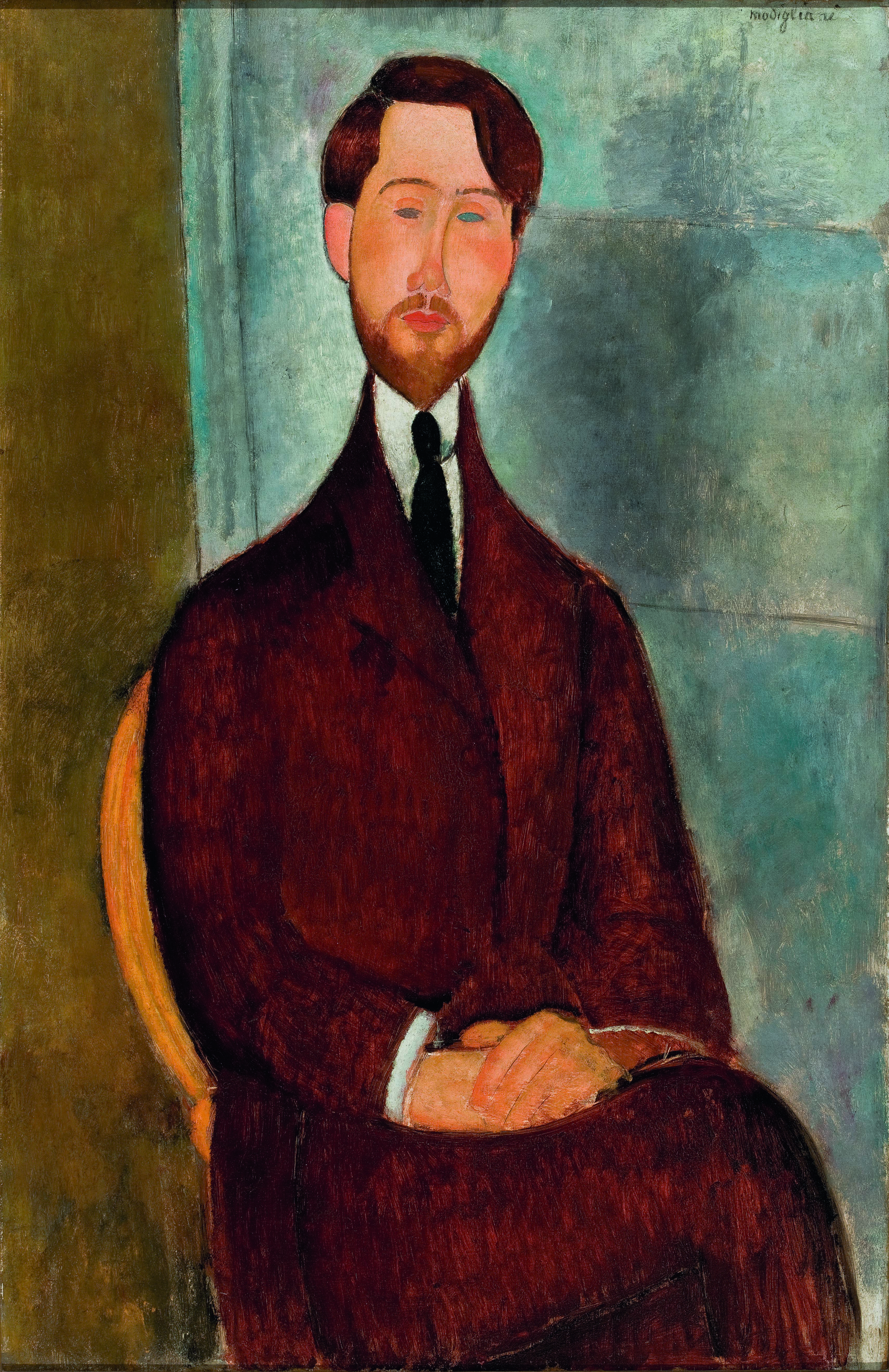
Amedeo Modigliani Portrait of Leopold Zborowski, 1916-19

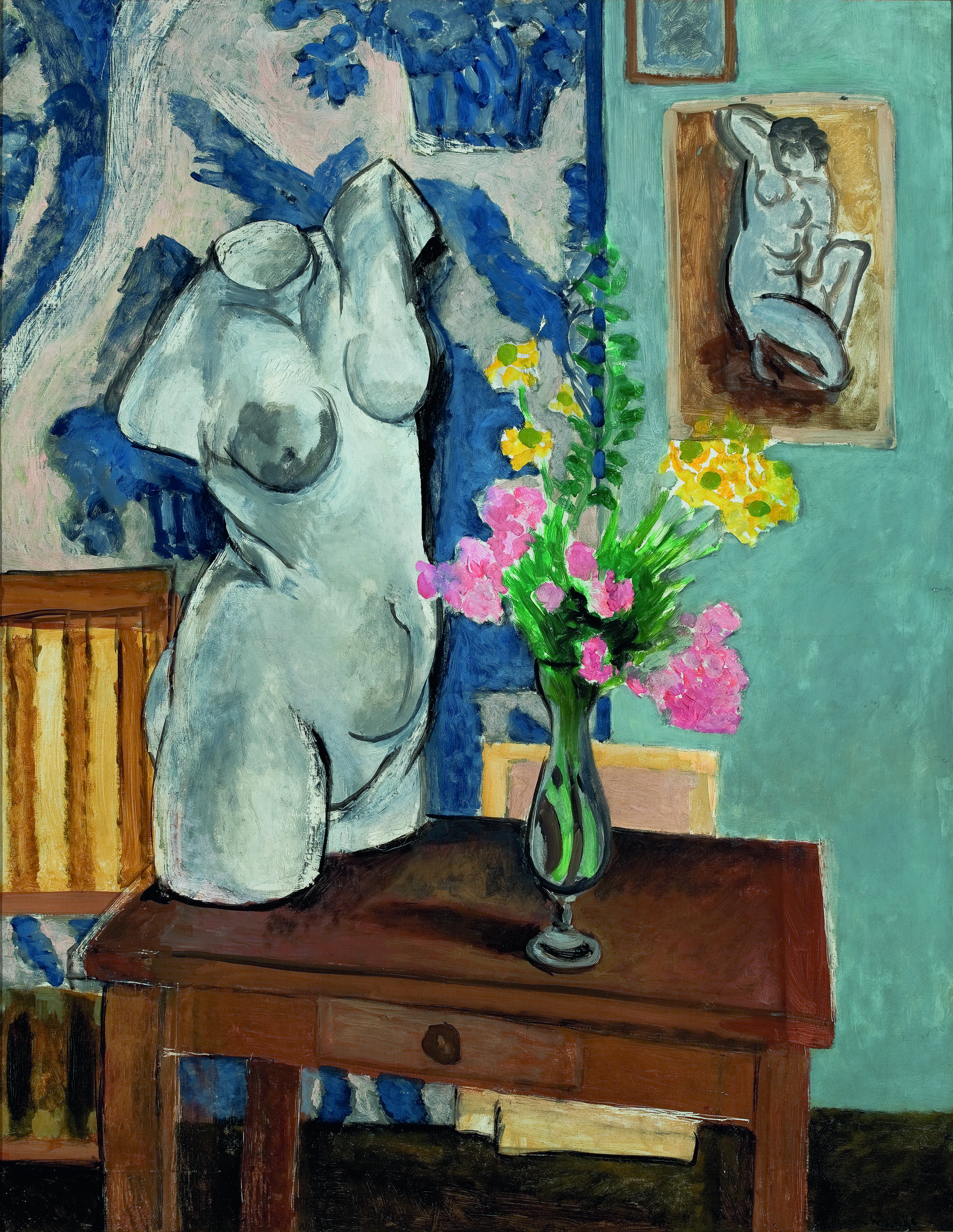
Henri Matisse The Plaster Torso, 1919

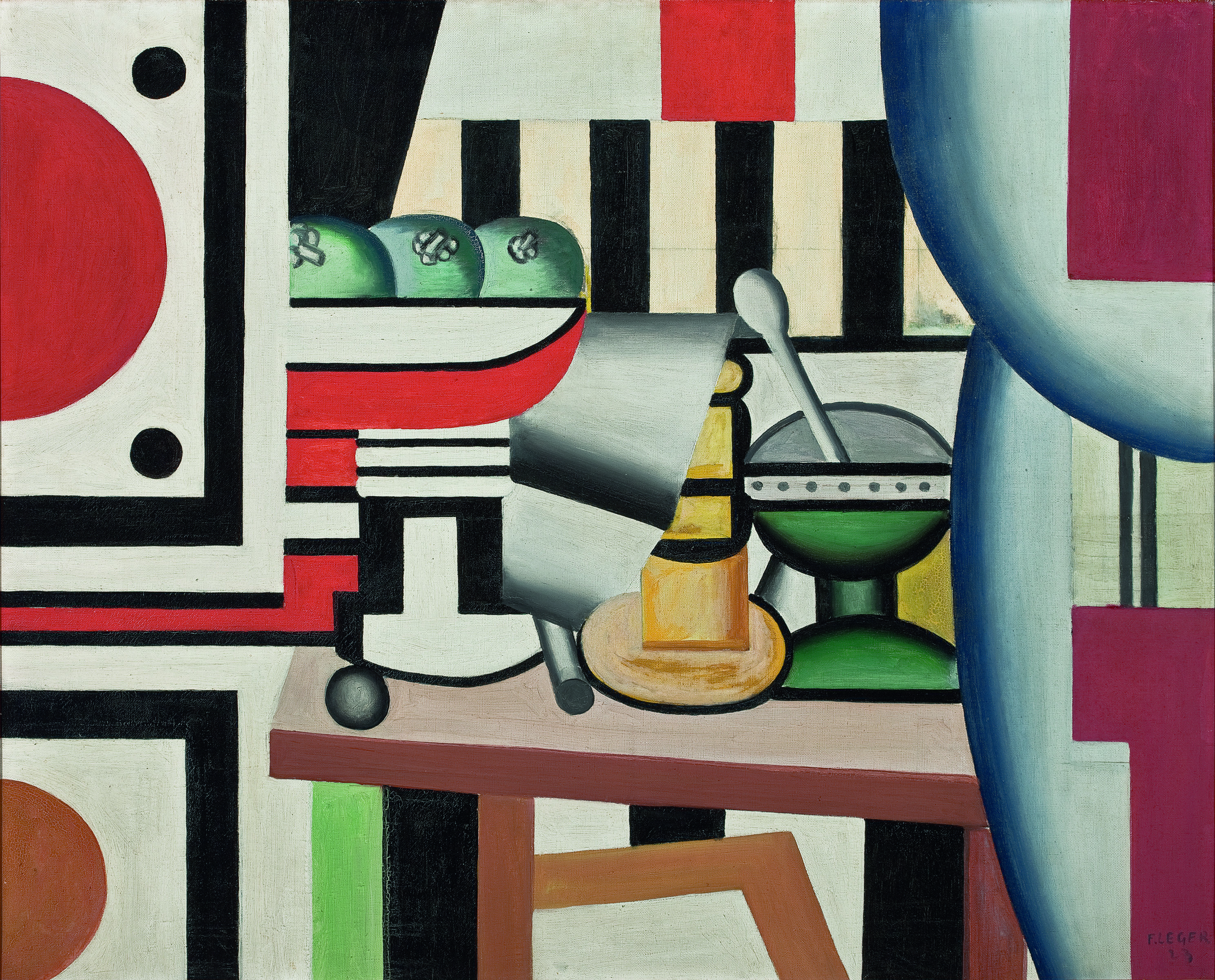
Fernand Léger Bowl with Pears, 1923

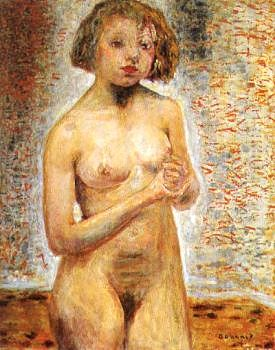
Pierre Bonnard Female Nude, 1930-33

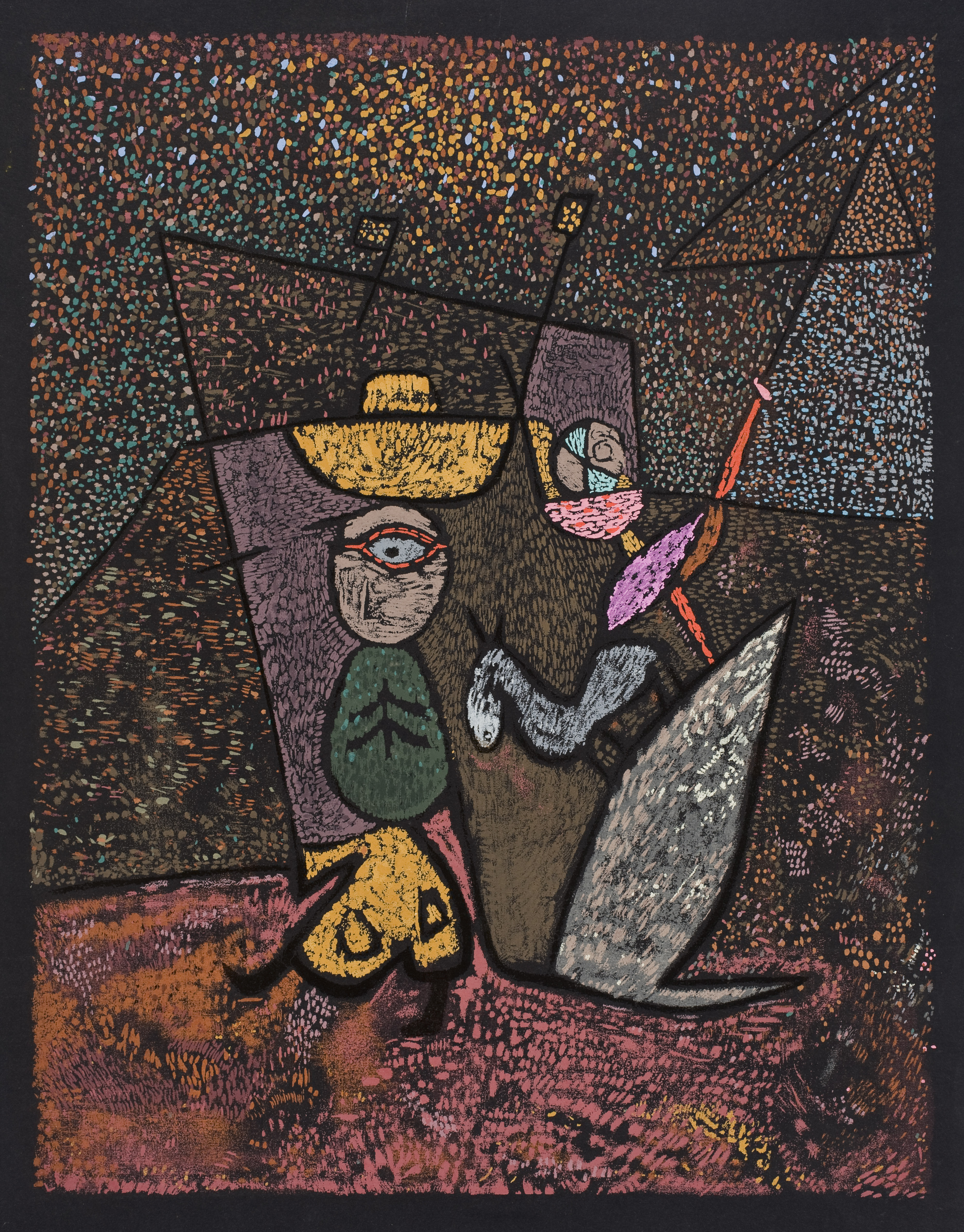
Paul Klee Traveling Circus, 1940

== See also ==
- Museum of Contemporary Art, University of São Paulo
- Ema Gordon Klabin Cultural Foundation
- Eva Klabin Foundation
- MASP Antique Market
- Museu Nacional de Belas Artes
- Pinacoteca do Estado de São Paulo
