= Feast of the Rosary =

1506 painting by Albrecht Dürer

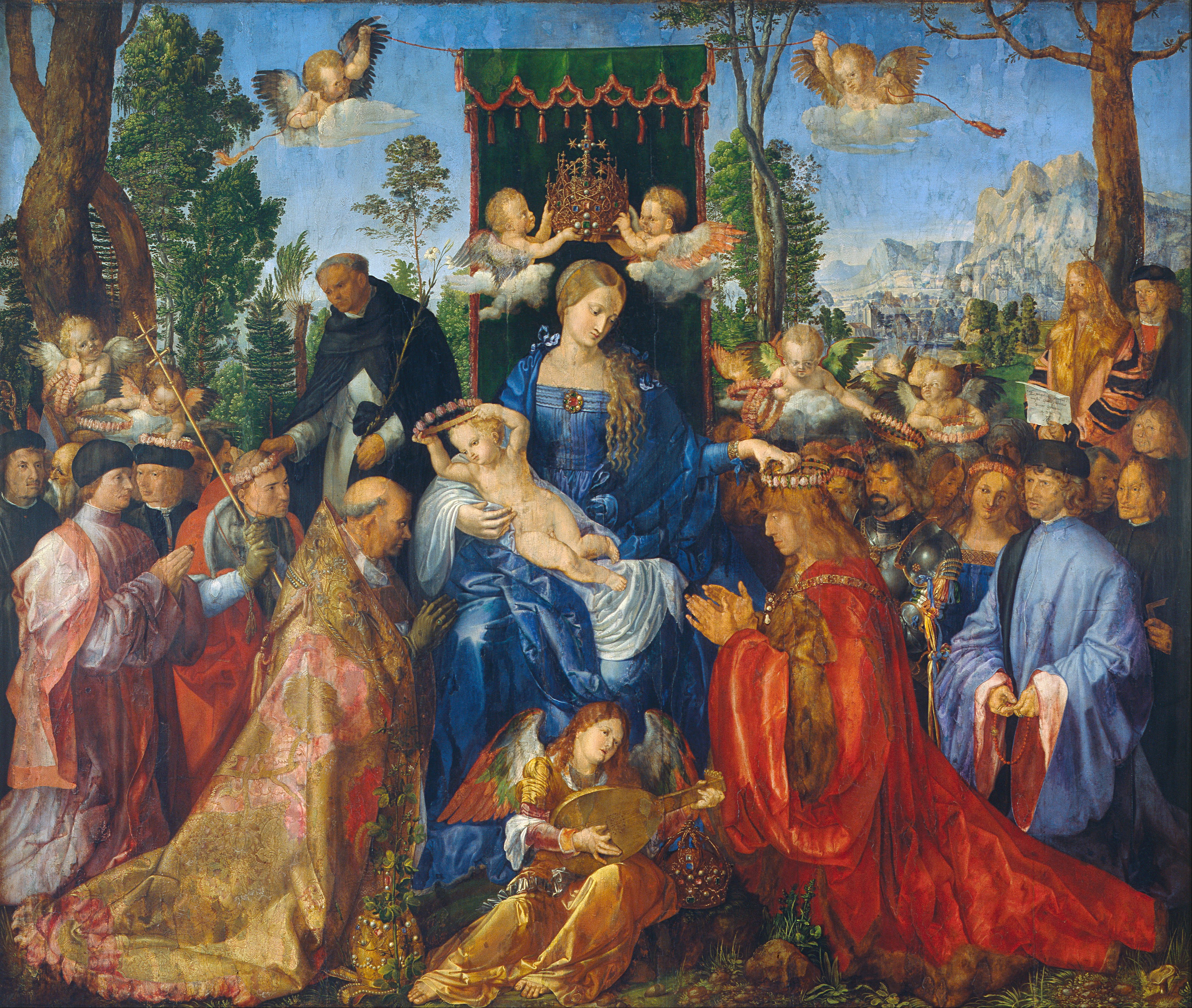
- Artist: Albrecht Dürer
- Year: 1506
- Medium: Oil on panel
- Dimensions: 161.5 cm × 192 cm (63.6 in × 76 in)
- Location: National Gallery, Prague

The Feast of the Rosary (German: Rosenkranzfest) is a 1506 oil painting by Albrecht Dürer, now in the National Gallery, Prague, Czech Republic. According to Czech art historian Jaroslav Pešina, it is "probably the most superb painting that a German master has ever created." The work also relates to a series of artworks commissioned by Maximilian I, his Burgundian subjects or figures close to his family to commemorate the Duchess Mary of Burgundy, Maximilian's first wife and to provide the focus for a cult-like phenomenon that associated her with her name-saint, the Virgin Mary.

== History ==
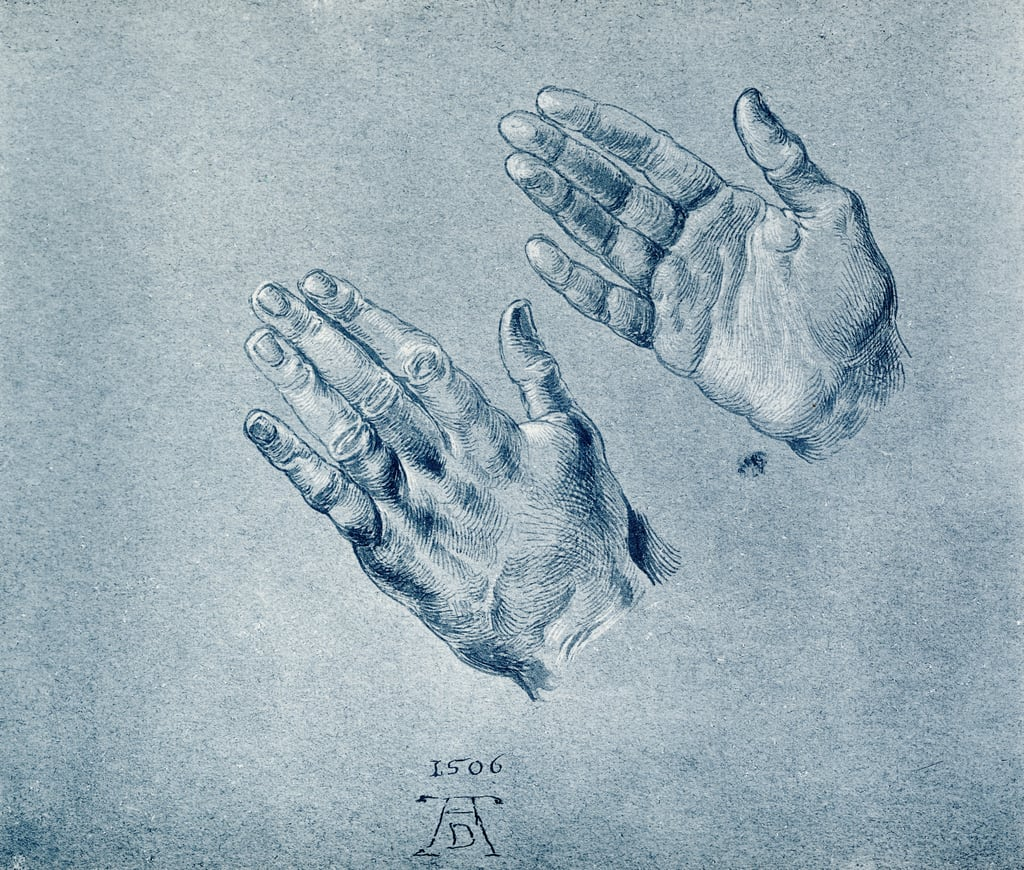
Preparatory drawing. Hands of Maximilian. In Feast of the Rosary, Dürer shifted the hands closer together, so that his left hand overlapped his right palm.

The work was initially commissioned by Jakob Fugger, an intermediary between emperor Maximilian I and Pope Julius II, during the painter's stay as the banker's guest in Augsburg, though it was produced whilst the painter was in Venice.

The contract was renewed in the Italian city by the fraternity of traders from Nuremberg (Dürer's hometown) and from other German cities, the latter being supported by the Fugger family. These traders were particularly active in the Fondaco dei Tedeschi and their fraternity had been founded in Strasbourg by Jakob Sprenger in 1474. According to the contract, the painting was to be finished before May 1506 and then hung in the German national church in Venice, San Bartolomeo on the Rialto. It also stated it was to portray the Feast of the Rosary - German expatriates in Venice were particularly devoted to Our Lady of the Rosary.

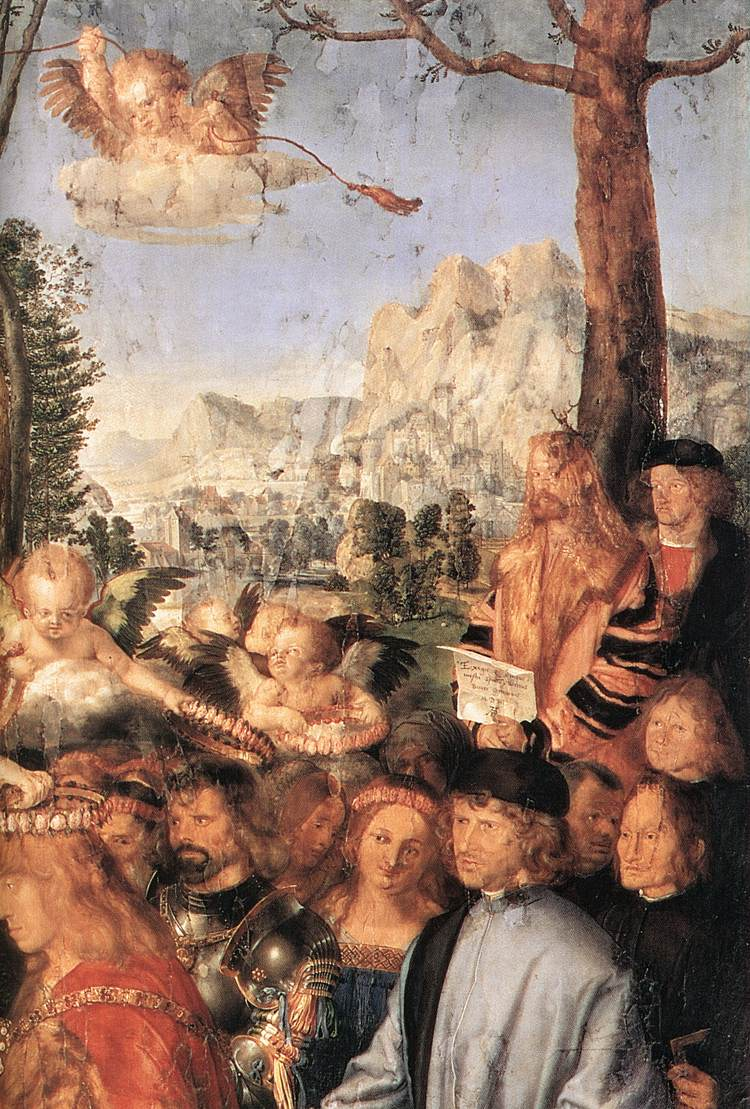
Detail of the landscape

Dürer was still working on the painting in September that year, when the Doge, the Patriarch, other Venetian nobles and a number of artists visited Dürer's workshop to see the finished work. Dürer later described the visit in a 1523 letter to Nuremberg's Senate, stating that he had declined an offer from Doge Leonardo Loredan to become official painter to the Republic of Venice the doge had offered him. The artists involved in the visit may have included Giovanni Bellini.

The work was acquired by emperor Rudolf II in 1606, who moved it to Prague. It was assigned to the Strahov Monastery and over the centuries was restored several times, damaging the painted surface. It was later moved to the Rudolfinum and then to the National Gallery of the Czech capital.

== Description ==
The painting shows the Virgin Mary at the centre, enthroned and holding the Christ Child, with two flying angels holding an elaborated royal crown made of gold, pearls and gems over her; this was a Flemish art scheme already widespread in the German area at the time. The throne's backrest is covered with a green drape and by a baldachin which is also held by two flying cherubim. A single angel sits at the Virgin's feet playing a lute, an evident homage to Giovanni Bellini's altarpieces. Mary is depicted handing out rose garlands to two groups of kneeling worshippers, portrayed in two symmetrical rows at the sides.

The two rows are headed, on the left, by Pope Julius II (who had approved the German fraternities with a bull in 1474), crowned by the Child and followed by a procession of religious figures; and, on the right, by the German emperor Frederick III (portrayed with the face of his son and patron of Dürer, Maximilian I), crowned by Mary and followed by a procession of lay people. Dürer likely based his portrait of the emperor on a drawing by Ambrogio de Predis, who had worked for Maximilian at Innsbruck. The pope and the emperor, then considered to be the supreme authorities of the Catholic world, have taken off the papal tiara and the imperial crown respectively and are shown kneeling before the Virgin to receive the Christ Child's blessing.

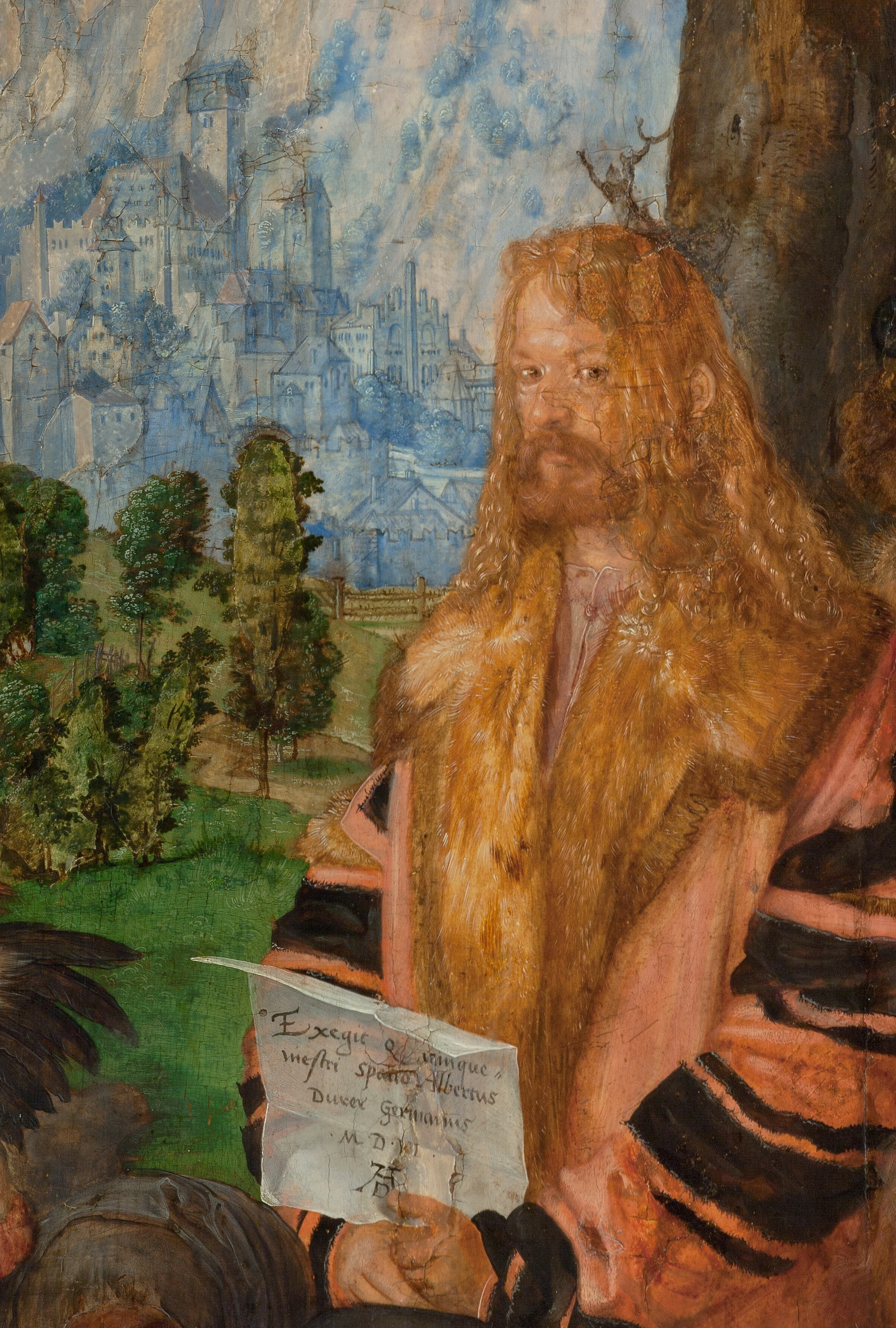
Detail of Dürer's self-portrait (Note: The inscription reads "Exegit quinquemestri spatio Albertus Dürer Germanus." (Latin: Albrecht Dürer the German spent (required, finished [this] in) the space of five months.) (Pešina 1962, p. 24))

Other angels are distributing crowns of flowers, as well as St. Dominic of Guzman (protector of the adoration of Mary and of the Rosary), who stands at the side of the Virgin. Near the left border is the patriarch of Venice, Antonio Soriano, with the hands joined, and, next to him, Burkard von Speyer, then chaplain of the church of San Bartolomeo, who was also portrayed by Dürer in another painting.

On the right, near a lush Alpine landscape, is the artist's self-portrait with a cartouche in his hand: here is the signature with a short inscription, reporting the time needed to complete the work. The characters next to the painter are likely Leonhard Vilt, founder of the Brotherhood of the Rosary in Venice, and (in black) Hieronymus of Augsburg, the architect of the new Fondaco dei Tedeschi. Annexed is the donor's portrait.

== Commentaries ==
The style of the work is reminiscent of some Bellini's works featuring the same quiet monumental appearance, such as the San Giobbe Altarpiece (1487) or the San Zaccaria Altarpiece (1505), especially regarding the guitar playing angel in the center. About two-thirds of the work was subject to later repainting, including the great part of the heads and some half of the panel.

The work is also seen as a tribute to Maximilian's first wife, Mary of Burgundy. Here the Virgin Mary (representation of Mary of Burgundy) was depicted holding the infant Jesus (representation of Philip the Fair) while placing a rosary on the head of a kneeling Maximilian. When the Fraternity of the Rosary was established in 1475 in Cologne, Maximilian and his father Frederick III were present and among the earliest members. Already in 1478, in Le chappellet des dames, Molinet, as the Burgundy court chronicler, placed a symbolic rosary on the head of Mary of Burgundy. Similarly, in 1518, one year before the emperor's own death, under the order of Zlatko, Bishop of Vienna, Dürer painted The death of the Virgin, which was also the scene of the deathbed of Mary of Burgundy, with Maximilian, Philip of Spain, Zlatko and other notables around the couch. Philip was presented as a young St. John while Maximilian bowed down as one of the Apostles. (The work was last seen in the 1822 sale of the Fries collection.) The Alamire manuscript VatS 160, a choirbook sent to Pope Leo X as a gift, probably by a member of the Burgundian-Habsburg family or a person close to Maximilian, contains numerous references to the connection between the Virgin Mary, the rosary symbol and Mary of Burgundy.

David Rothenberg notes that the painting Feast of the Rosary is a "direct visual counterpart" to the motet Virgo Prudentissima by Heinrich Isaac (written in 1507 for the Reichstag in Konstanz and for Maximilian's 1508 coronation as Holy Roman Emperor): "The most prudent Virgin thus crowns the Wise King with a rose garland at the very moment when she herself is about to be crowned Queen of Heaven." Both the motet and the painting reflect the idea that the White King (Weisskunig) claimed his legitimacy directly from the Queen of Heaven and not through mediation by the Church. Bubenik agrees with Rothenberg's assessment and points out that in the painting one can also see a lute.

== See also ==
- List of paintings by Albrecht Dürer
- Breviary Hymns of the Rosary
- Cultural depictions of Maximilian I, Holy Roman Emperor
