= San Zaccaria, Venice (photograph) =

Photograph by Thomas Struth

San Zaccaria, Venice is a color photograph taken by German photographer Thomas Struth, in 1995. The photograph was taken inside the San Zaccaria church in Venice, and is part of his series Museum Photographs, dedicated to the interior of several museums and monuments across the world. It has a ten prints edition.

== History and description ==
Struth became interested by the work of the Italian painter Giovanni Bellini, due to his conexion to the Scottish art historian Giles Robertson, who published a monograph on him, in 1968, and who had been the subject of two of his portraits. Struth took interest in the current painting, the San Zaccaria Altarpiece or Sacra Conversazione, after this book and also after visiting Venice, in 1990. He decided to include it, in his religious environment, in his series dedicated to Museum Photographs, that he took from 1990 to 2003.

The current photograph focus in particular in the San Zaccaria Altarpiece, seen at the center of the composition, and surrounded by several other religious themed paintings in the church where it is located. The altarpiece depicting the Virgin Mary with the Christ Child, surrounded by saints, is notable for his use of trompe l'oeil, which stands out in Struth's photograph. The photograph unites both the spaces of the paintings in the wall and the interior of the church, with his large columns, pews and several visitors. A couple of visitors is seen at the left, attentively looking at the altarpiece. Other people are seated in the row of pews, possibly in meditation or prayer, as they mark the receding perspective of the composition. As in other similar works of the author, past and present in the mediums of painting and photography are united to create a new artwork.

The Metropolitan Museum of Art website states: "Struth's picture unifies the timeless and the ephemeral, making the ideal and the real two perspectives on the same theme. But if his photograph rivals painting on the high ground of seriousness and looks back upon five hundred years of tradition, it also faces forward: It will convey this inheritance to the next new medium that will, in turn, reflect upon photography and painting."

== Art market ==
A print of the photograph was sold for $1,124,191 ($1.52 million in 2024) at Christie's London, on 18 October 2013, making it one of the highest prices reached by one of his works.

== Public collections ==
There are prints of this photograph at the Hamburger Bahnhof, the Kunsthaus Zürich, the Astrup Fearnley Museum of Modern Art, in Oslo, the Metropolitan Museum of Art, in New York, the Cleveland Museum of Art, among others.
