= Willys Madonna =

Painting by Giovanni Bellini

- Virgin with the Standing Child, Embracing his Mother
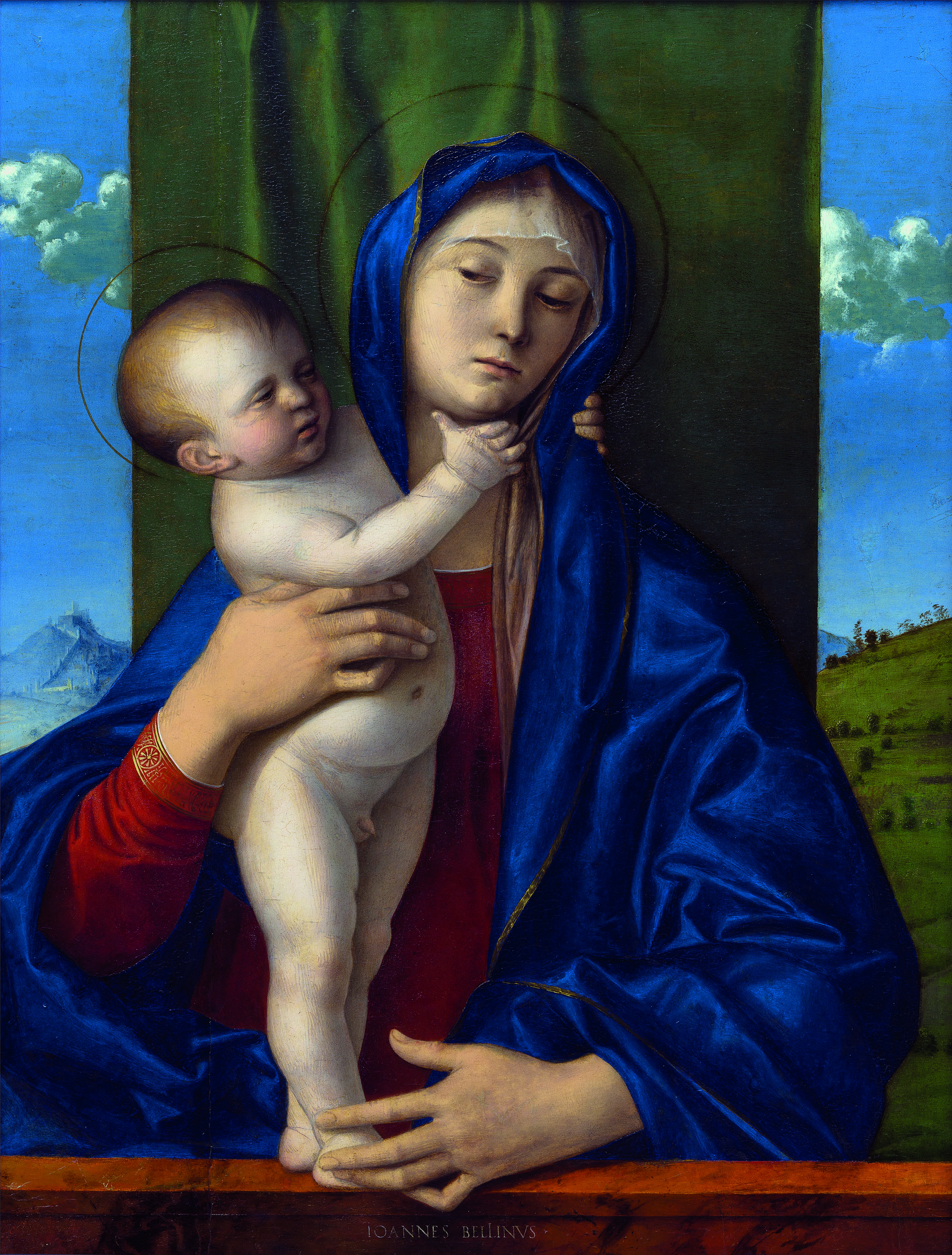
- Artist: Giovanni Bellini
- Year: 15th century
- Dimensions: 75 cm (30 in) × 58.5 cm (23.0 in) × 4.5 cm (1.8 in)
- Location: São Paulo Museum of Art, Brazil
- Accession: MASP.00016

Virgin with the Standing Child, Embracing his Mother, also known as Willys Madonna, is a painting by the Italian Renaissance master Giovanni Bellini (Venice, 1425/1433–1516). It is now in the São Paulo Museum of Art in São Paulo, Brazil.

== Painting ==
The iconography of Virgin with the Standing Child, Embracing his Mother represented as a half-figure, behind a parapet, is extremely unusual in other painters, whereas it is almost a constant in Bellini's countless Virgins (i.e. the Contarini Madonna in the Accademia, Venice).

Rather than being just a formal preference, it is possible that this compositional device may involve some theological reasoning. According to a hypothesis first elaborated by Goffen and later by Camesasca, this is a variant of the Byzantine symbology, which originally pertained to the representation of Christ. In this representation, the half-figure would be a metaphor to suggest “the whole aspect” of the divine, as if this reduction would be better fitting it to the human comprehension.

It seems that Bellini was seeking, especially in the MASP work, the most heightened sacredness for the sacred. The interaction between the figures, though quite intense, is far from the domestic affectivity that is so appealing in many Italian Quattrocento Virgins (with Child). On the opposite, the sacredness of the group is highlighted, on the one hand, by the function of the parapet cutting off the viewer from the divine, and, on the other hand, by the boundary line between the sacred space and the profane landscape. This compartmentalization, and conceptual differentiations sensitive to space, or pictorial spaces, demonstrate Bellini's lack of interest in the axiom of unity of space imposed by the Florentine perspective. They show his drive to invent a space capable of conciliating a new painting landscape with a space reminiscent of the Byzantine intellectual mystique that so profoundly conditioned Venetian sensibility.

As many scholars, such as Camesasca and Tempestini, have demonstrated, the MASP work is the prototype for several copies, versions, and derivations, among which are those by Francesco da Santa Croce (Vicenza, Museo Civico), Filippo Mazzola and Rocco Marconi (both in Sarasota, Ringling Museum), Antonello de Saliba (Berlin, destroyed in 1945). Furthermore, two other copies are known, one of which at the Art Institute of Chicago, plus Bellini's variants, such as the Madonna degli Alberetti, 1487, of the Gallerie dell’Accademia in Venice and the Morelli Madonna, of the Accademia Carrara in Bergamo.

== Provenance ==
The painting was purchased on behalf of the São Paulo Museum of Art at the Wildenstein Gallery, New York City in 1947. It had been acquired by Wildenstein in 1945 from the collection of Isabel van Wie Willys, widow of John North Willys, from whom derives one of the names of this painting, and who bought it from the Duveen Gallery in 1915, having previously belonged to the collection of the Dukes of Argyll.

== See also ==
- List of works by Giovanni Bellini

== Bibliography ==
- Goffen, R. Icon and Vision: Giovanni Bellini’s half-length Madonnas College Art Assos., 1975.
- Camesasca, E. Da Raffaello a Goya… da Van Gogh a Picasso. 50 dipinti dal Museu de Arte di San Paolo del Brasile Exhibition Catalogue, Milan, Palazzo Reale, 1987.
- Tempestini, A. Giovanni Bellini. Catalogue Complet Paris, 1992.
- Marques, Luiz. Catálogo do Museu de Arte de São Paulo Assis Chateaubriand: Arte Italiana, São Paulo, Prêmio, 1988, p. 185-186.
