= Santa Cristina al Tiverone Altarpiece =

Painting by Lorenzo Lotto

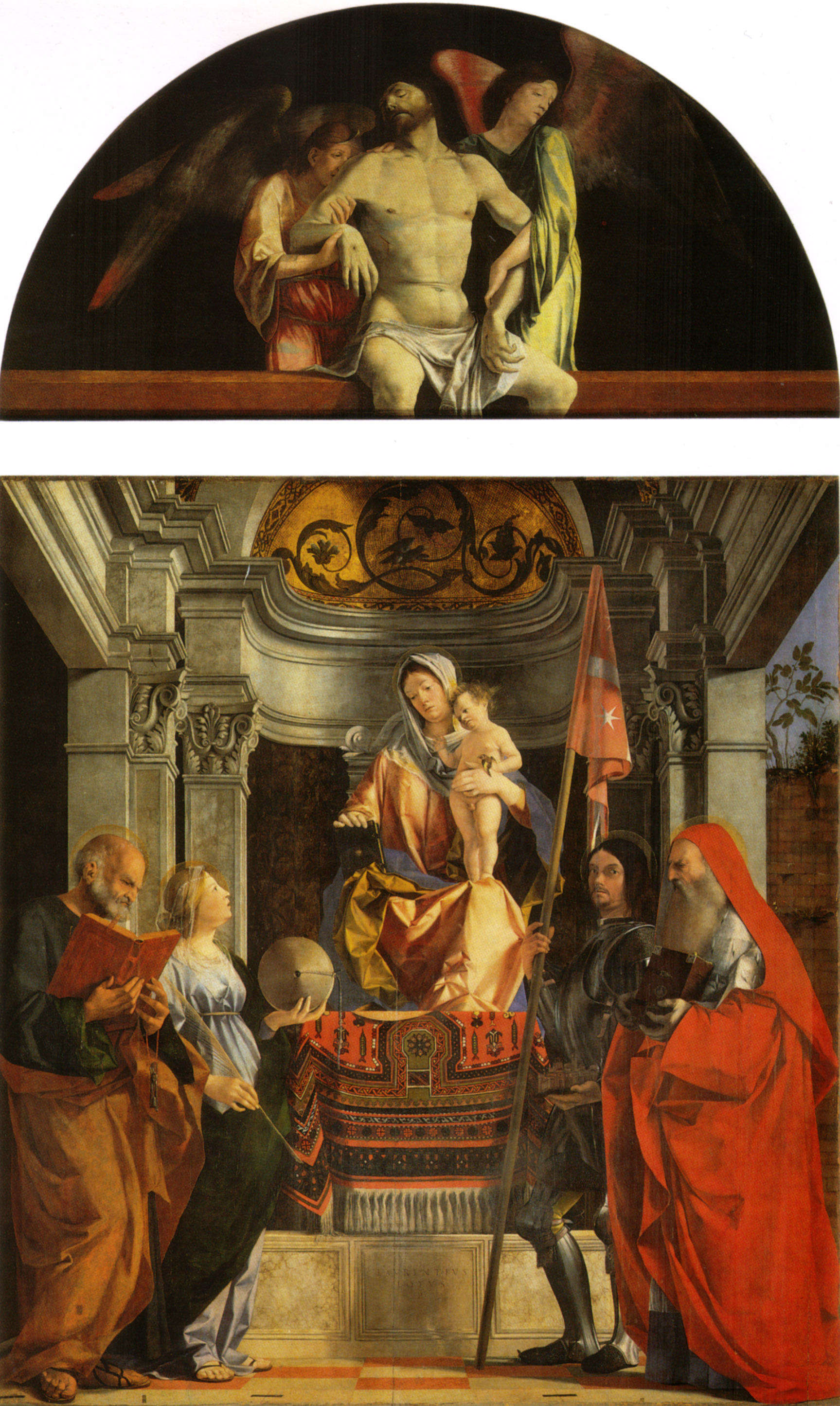
- Artist: Lorenzo Lotto
- Year: c. 1504–1506
- Medium: Oil on panel
- Dimensions: 267 cm × 179 cm (105 in × 70 in)
- Location: Church of Santa Cristina; Quinto di Treviso

Santa Cristina al Tiverone Altarpiece is an oil-on-panel painting by the Italian Renaissance painter Lorenzo Lotto, executed around 1504–1506. It is still housed in its original location, the parish church of Santa Cristina in Quinto di Treviso, a frazione of Treviso, northern Italy.

Measuring 90x179 cm (lunette) and 177x162 cm (central panel), it is signed "Laurentius / Lotus / P.[inxit]" at the base of the throne. It was perhaps commissioned around 1505 by bishop Bernardo de' Rossi, in whose court Lotto worked at the time. It was released on 14 May 1507, just before the artist's move to Recanati.

== Description ==
The main panel, of rectangular shape, shows a sacred conversation with Madonna and Child sitting on a large throne. Around her are the saints Peter, Christine, Liberalis and Jerome, all enclosed within a classical style architecture.

The composition derives from Giovanni Bellini's San Zaccaria Altarpiece, as testified by the niche in the throne with Byzantine mosaics, and the oriental carpet at Mary's feet. Perhaps inspired by Giorgione's Castelfranco Madonna is the figure of Liberalis, the patron saint of Treviso, as a knight holding a model of the city in a hand.

The baby Jesus holds a goldfinch, an allegory of his future Passion. The right side opens on an external wall covered by grass.

The lunette shows instead a Pietà, also based on Bellini, with the dead Christ supported by two angels.

== Sources ==
- Pirovano, Carlo (2002). Lotto. Milan: Electa.
