= Contarini Madonna =

Painting by Giovanni Bellini

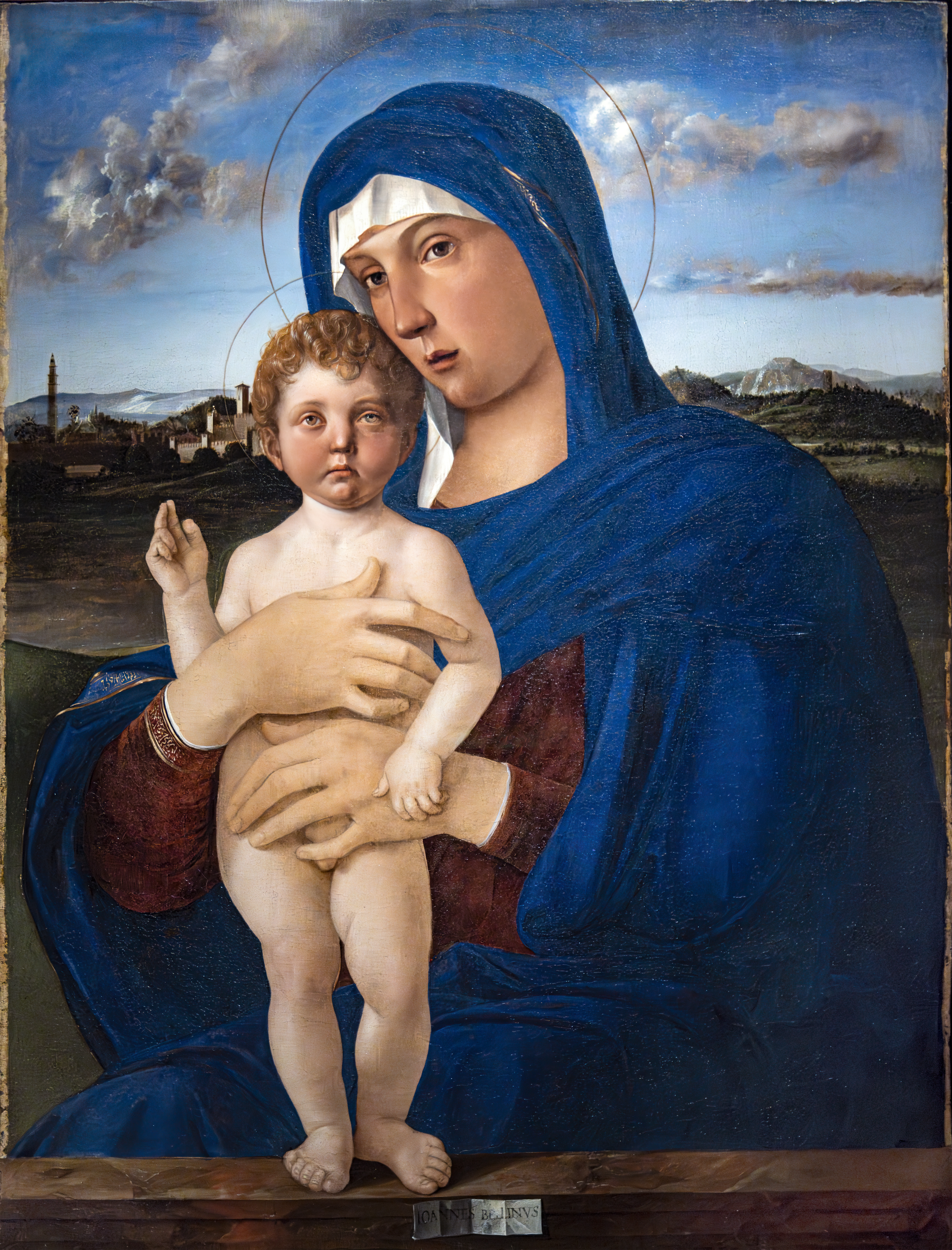
- Artist: Giovanni Bellini
- Year: c. 1475-1480
- Medium: Oil on panel
- Dimensions: 78 cm × 256 cm (31 in × 101 in)
- Location: Accademia, Venice

The Contarini Madonna (Italian: Madonna Contarini) is an oil painting by the Italian Renaissance master Giovanni Bellini, dating from c. 1475–1480 now in the Gallerie dell'Accademia in Venice.

== Description ==
The painting shows the Madonna holding Jesus who stands on a parapet in the foreground. Below is a cartouche with the artist's signature, IOANNES BELLINVS. The blessing Child has similar features to that in the San Giobbe Altarpiece, dating to the same decade or a few years later. His icon-like staring appearance recalls the Byzantine painting, which was one of the roots of the Venetian painting school.

The background is formed by a soft landscape, with hills and a city with towers.

== See also ==
- San Giobbe Altarpiece
- List of works by Giovanni Bellini

== Sources ==
- Olivari, Mariolina (2007). "Giovanni Bellini". Pittori del Rinascimento. Florence: Scala.
