= Montini Altarpiece =

Painting by Cima da Conegliano

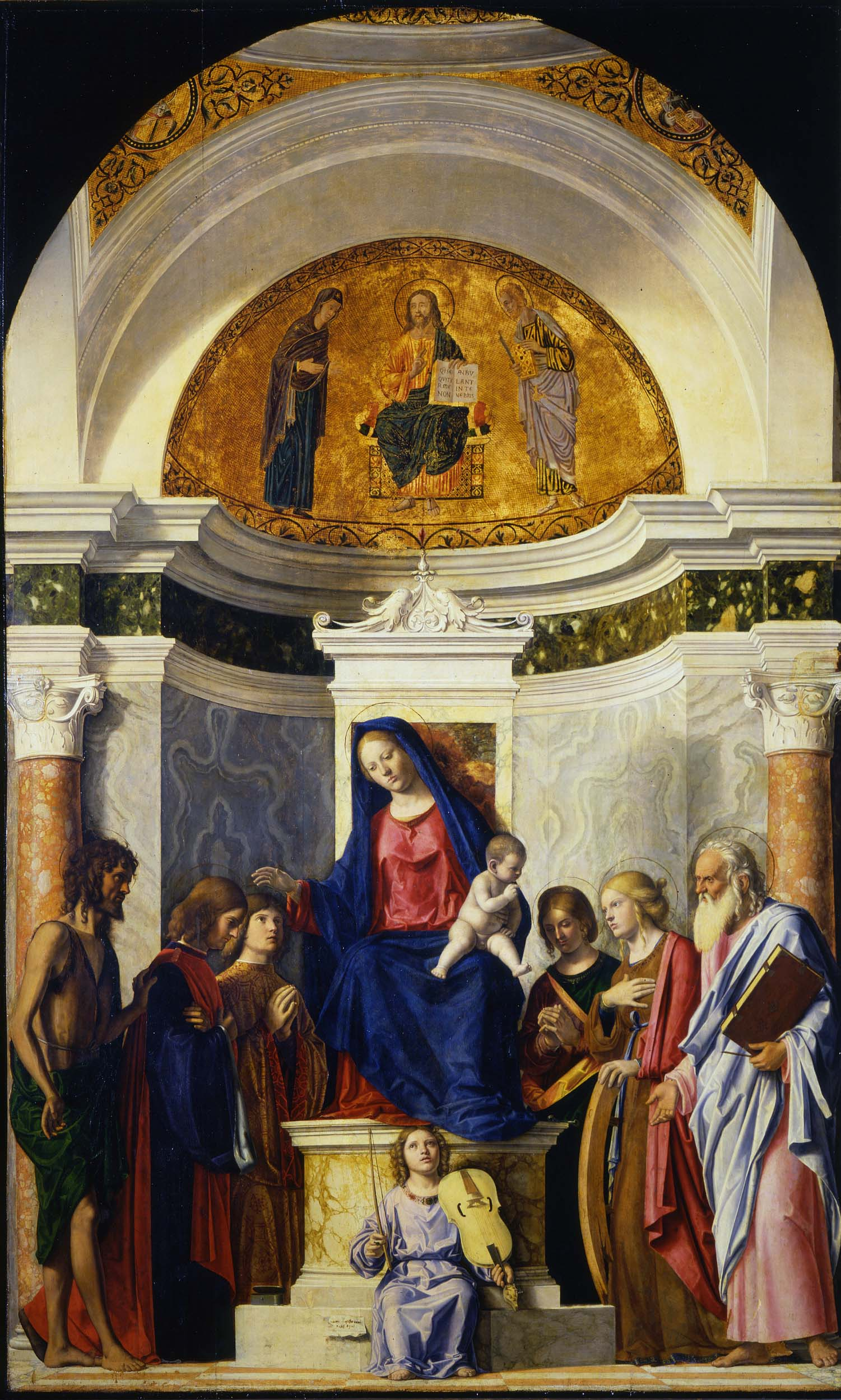
- Artist: Cima da Conegliano
- Year: c. 1506–1507
- Medium: Oil on panel
- Location: Galleria Nazionale, Parma

The Montini Altarpiece (Italian: Pala Montini) is an oil on canvas painting by the Italian Renaissance artist Cima da Conegliano, dating from around 1506–1507 and housed in the Galleria Nazionale of Parma, Italy.

The work adopts the same scheme of several altarpieces by Giovanni Bellini, such as the San Giobbe Altarpiece. It was originally executed for the Parma Cathedral.

It shows the Virgin Mary on a high throne in a mosaic-decorated apse, while offering a hand towards the bowing Saints Cosmas and Damian. A bearded Saint John the Baptist, in a sleeveless vest, is portrayed on the left. On the right, the Christ Child is blessing Saint Apollonia (whose attribute of the pincer with tooth is in the plinth before her), Saint Catherine of Alexandria (with her attribute, the broken wheel), and Saint John the Evangelist (with a book). An angel sits at the foot of the throne in the centre foreground and holds a stringed musical instrument.

== Sources ==
- Adani, Giuseppe (2007). Correggio pittore universale. Correggio: Silvana Editoriale.
