= San Zaccaria Altarpiece =

Altarpiece by Giovanni Bellini

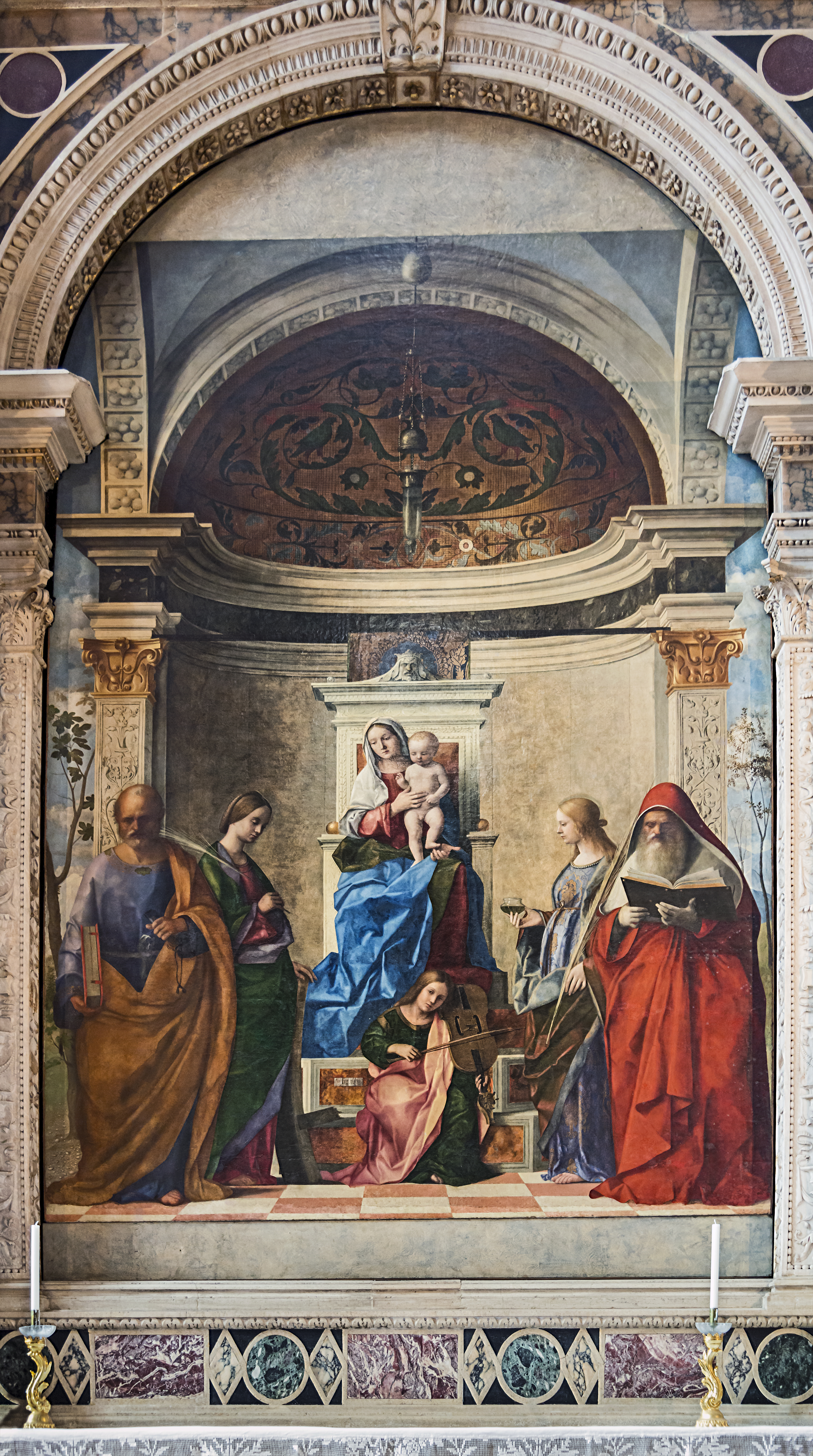
- Artist: Giovanni Bellini
- Year: 1505
- Medium: Oil on panel
- Dimensions: 500 cm × 235 cm (200 in × 93 in)
- Location: San Zaccaria, Venice

The San Zaccaria Altarpiece (also called Madonna Enthroned with Child and Saints) is a painting by the Italian Renaissance painter Giovanni Bellini, executed in 1505 and located in the church of San Zaccaria, Venice.

== Patron and date ==
The patron of the altarpiece is unknown. It is Bellini's first work in which the influence of Giorgione is undeniable, starting the last phase in the artist's career, a tonalist one. The Altarpiece has stayed in site (in situ) in the church since it was completed in 1505.

A later story has now been intertwined with the work and repeated in many sources: in 1648, the writer and painter Carlo Ridolfi remarked that the work had been commissioned in memory of Pietro Capello (Cappello), a Venetian politician and diplomat, describing it as "one of the most beautiful and delicate by the artist". However, Pietro Capello died in 1523, long after Giovanni Bellini's completion of the altarpiece in 1505. Pietro Capello is interred in the Church of San Zaccaria and above his tomb was adorned with a painting made around 1500 that was created in the workshop of Giovanni Bellini, but it showed the Presentation in the Temple (titled the Circumcision and now in the National Gallery of Art, London), not the Virgin and Child enthroned.

To the left of the music-playing angel is a small plaque, known as a cartellino, where Bellini signed and dated the work: "IOANNES BELLIVUS / MCCCCCV" (Giovanni Bellini, 1505).

The work is set in a large niche, depicting a sacred conversation within an established scheme: the Madonna and Child enthroned, a musician angel on a step and four saints placed symmetrically at the sides. They are St. Peter the Apostle, St. Catherine of Alexandria, St. Lucy and St. Jerome.

While the general ensemble is not different from previous works, such as the San Giobbe Altarpiece (which shares the apse with mosaics, for example), Bellini introduced some novelties, such as the side openings with landscape, inspired by Alvise Vivarini Battutii Altarpiece, once in Belluno (now lost). The colors and light show the new adherence of Bellini to Giorgione's color and mood style.

The egg above Mary's head is a symbol of the creation, perhaps a citation of Piero della Francesca's Brera Altarpiece. The lucerna below recalls Andrea Mantegna's San Zeno Altarpiece.

== Materials ==
The altarpiece was painted using tempera and oil on wood. Tempera is an egg based painting substance that dries quickly making it easy to use and layer over, a popular choice among artists during the period. Bellini also used some oil paints to create more definition with depth, soft edges, tone transitions, and better color pigments.

Part of the top is truncated: just below the arch still shows the damaged that was incurred during the removal by the French under Napoleon (see below: Theft and return). While in France, the painting underwent a major physical transformation: the painting surface was lifted off the supporting wood panel and then it was applied with glue to canvas. Today, the canvas painting has been installed in the church, but over a different altar of the church than the original one, therefore it is not considered in situ. The painting was also cut on the bottom so that it would fit this space. It would be easy to think this was the original altar, since the carved stone columns and their capitals practically mirror those painted in Bellini's altarpiece.

== Subject ==
The altarpiece is set in a large semi-circular niche, known as an apse, and depicts in a pyramidal (triangular) composition of the Virgin and Child enthroned, surrounded by four saints and an angel. The dome with mosaics on the top of the altarpiece create a sense of depth in the room and an addition of space behind the throne and subjects.

Giovanni Bellini was repeatedly commissioned to paint the subject of the Virgin and Child because of its religious popularity during this century in Italy, especially in Venice. Most of these devotional paintings, while exhibiting variations in their iconographic details, show a deep influence of Byzantine art and stylistic principles. In this manner, the San Zaccaria Altarpiece was made in relation to the two other Venetian altarpieces by Giovanni Bellini, including the San Giobbe Altarpiece (1487) and the Frari Triptych (1488). There are two common stylistics denominator among these three altarpieces by Bellini: first, is the inclusion of the mosaic apse, and thereby serves as a visual link to the mosaics located in the apse and domes of St. Mark's Basilica in Venice. The second common element is that the enthroned Virgin and Child is an allusion to the Byzantine representation of the Virgin Hodegetria. One noteworthy difference between Bellini's 1505 San Zaccaria Altarpiece and the earlier altarpieces, San Giobbe Altarpiece and the Frari Triptych is that the architectural setting opens up to a landscape filled with rolling green hills, wispy trees, puffy-white clouds set a light-blue sky. This feature may have been inspired by the now-lost work of Alvise Vivarini, an altarpiece made for Santa Maria dei Battuti, Belluno (formerly Kaiser-Friedrich Museum, Berlin, destroyed in 1945).

=== Virgin and Child ===
The Virgin Mary and Christ-child are at the top of the pyramid scheme of the altarpiece, making them the main focus as a result of linear perspective. Mary is seen without a crown to portray her as a simple, young mother; someone the viewer can feel comfortable with and possibly relate to. The Christ-child has his right hand raised to bless the worshipper/viewer before the altar. Both the Virgin Mary and Christ-child look downward, to acknowledge any viewers kneeling in prayer before the altar. Additionally, Mary is dressed in a rich blue robe, which was made using ultramarine, a luxury pigment during this time period. The use of this pigment not only acknowledged the church as a place of wealth and power, but showed that Bellini was a respected artist.

==== Saints and Angel ====
In the painting, four saints are shown: two sets of paired male and female saints. Furthest to the left of the composition is Saint Peter (pictured carrying the bible and the keys of heaven). Saint Peter is also seen with a yellow-orange mantle, which was finished with an arsenic sulfide mineral pigment. To the right is Saint Catherine of Alexandria who is seen holding the palm of martyrdom while leaning on a breaking wheel, a reference to her martyrdom. Saint Catherine is dressed in dark green colors that were a combination of lead-tin yellow, lead white, and verdigris pigments; it was finished with a deep, dark green glaze for vibrance. These pigments demonstrated the wealth of the church but also the skill of Bellini to create such beautiful colors with his paints.

On the other side of Mary stands Saint Lucy, the saint of light, also holding a palm of martyrdom and a glass lamp in her other hand. The palm for both is intended to represent the suffering they went through when they chose faith in Christ as their first priority. In addition, the glass lamp that Saint Lucy holds reflects the fact that Lucy would often give food to the poor at night, using a lamp for light.

Lastly, on the far right is Saint Jerome portrayed in a red, reading a book that could represent the Vulgate, or Latin translation of the Bible which Saint Jerome translated himself. Saint Jerome's robe was painted using red lake and vermilion pigments.

The billowing robes on Saint Peter and Saint Jerome were painted with volume and shadow to enhance their size and male figure, contrasting the female saints. The bilaterally symmetrical arrangement of the saints is further enhanced by the fact that the two female saints are show in profile and closest to the Madonna, while the two male saints, located on the outer edges of the composition are show facing frontal while their gazes are cast down.

Finally, in the center, an angel sits on the bottom step of the marble throne playing the lira de braccio, a violin-like instrument. The instrument is shown with seven strings instead of the typical nine strings on other instruments which is meant to represent the seven other planets. The music-making angel is pictured with its lira de braccio to allow the audience to imagine its peaceful tune in the tranquil environment and to offer comfort. The angel wears a combination of cool green and warm pinks, colors and tones that are observed throughout the painting: in the mosaic above, the nearby landscape, and the surrounding architecture. Each figure in the painting serves its own purpose but the angel is the only figure clearly looking out at the viewer, adding a tone of inclusion.

=== Sacra conversazione ===
The sacra conversazione (sacred conversation), which was originally developed in Florence and the popularized in Venice, is a genre of religious devotional works that shows the Virgin Mary with the Christ child upon a throne, surrounded by saints and angels which united them all into one space of harmony. The sacra conversazione is marked by the bright, vibrant colors in the San Zaccaria altarpiece, and was painted with an intent to create a beautiful space of worship. Each figure represented is in a different time and space; the altarpiece was a mutual meeting for all. Moreover, the figures of the altarpiece are shown in a calm, meditative state; all motion has stopped, calling the viewer to pause for prayer or reflection. The unity of the altarpiece brings a kind of silent communication; the angels signify transcendence and the trumpets represent harmony. Bellini was also known for painting different renditions of the sacra conversazione , the San Zaccaria Altarpiece was the last work in which he used this genre.

=== Symbolism ===
At the top of the throne there is a carved head of Solomon, representing divine wisdom. Behind Solomon is a leafy mask that is displayed directly above the Virgin Mary's throne. The leafage mask is a hallmark trait of the Renaissance, which also adds a descriptive and elegant vocabulary to the altarpiece. The mask is framed with a crown and a halo-like appearance of pomegranate leaves printed on a woven brocade cloth, as an honorary tribute to God. It also works to frame the symbolism of Salomon quite well. The symbolism of God above the throne acts as a safety net over the throne, the altar, and over the sacra conversazione.

Also featured at the very top of the central arch is a crystal lamp suspended from a hanging ostrich egg, both symbolizing the Virgin Birth. Ostrich eggs were typically hung over altars that were dedicated to the Virgin Mary and can be found in earlier Italian Renaissance paintings, including Andrea Mantegna's San Zeno Altarpiece (c. 1456–1459) and Pierro della Francesca's Brera Madonna (1472). The ostrich egg could also be a symbol of the Resurrection, regarding Christ and the divine life. The ostrich egg could also serve as a symbol of wealth for the church, as ostrich eggs were not commonly represented in society.

Along the left border of the altarpiece is a fig tree and along the right border is an acacia tree; both represent the passion and redemption that comes with the journey of life. The decoration of the gold mosaic includes acanthus foliage, along with partridges to symbolize the knowledge of Christ.

== Style ==
The San Zaccaria Altarpiece is considered one of his most famous altarpieces, which he completed at the age of seventy-four. Even at this advanced age for this project, Bellini's impressive painterly and observational skills do not seem to have not been diminished. Moreover, the San Zaccaria Altarpiece is acknowledged as Bellini's prime example of his life-long exploration into the effects of light and color and impressive realism that is set against classically-inspired architectural components, reflecting a culmination of his style. Although Bellini uses bright, intense colors, the mood of the San Zaccaria Altarpiece reflects a quiet, restrained and sacrosanct tone. This altarpiece in particular has been described as poetic because of the work's sacred atmosphere invites the viewer into a contemplative space.

The artist Giorgione was one of Bellini's pupils. During the time that Bellini was working on the San Zaccaria Altarpiece, Giorgione was completing the Castelfranco Madonna around 1504. While it remains unclear who inspired whom, since both artists were working contemporaneously, the works by each demonstrate a similar approach to the figures: both artists reduced the number of figures in the composition, placing them further back in the middle- and foregrounds, while also casting down the figures' gazes or casting shadows on their faces, slightly concealing them.

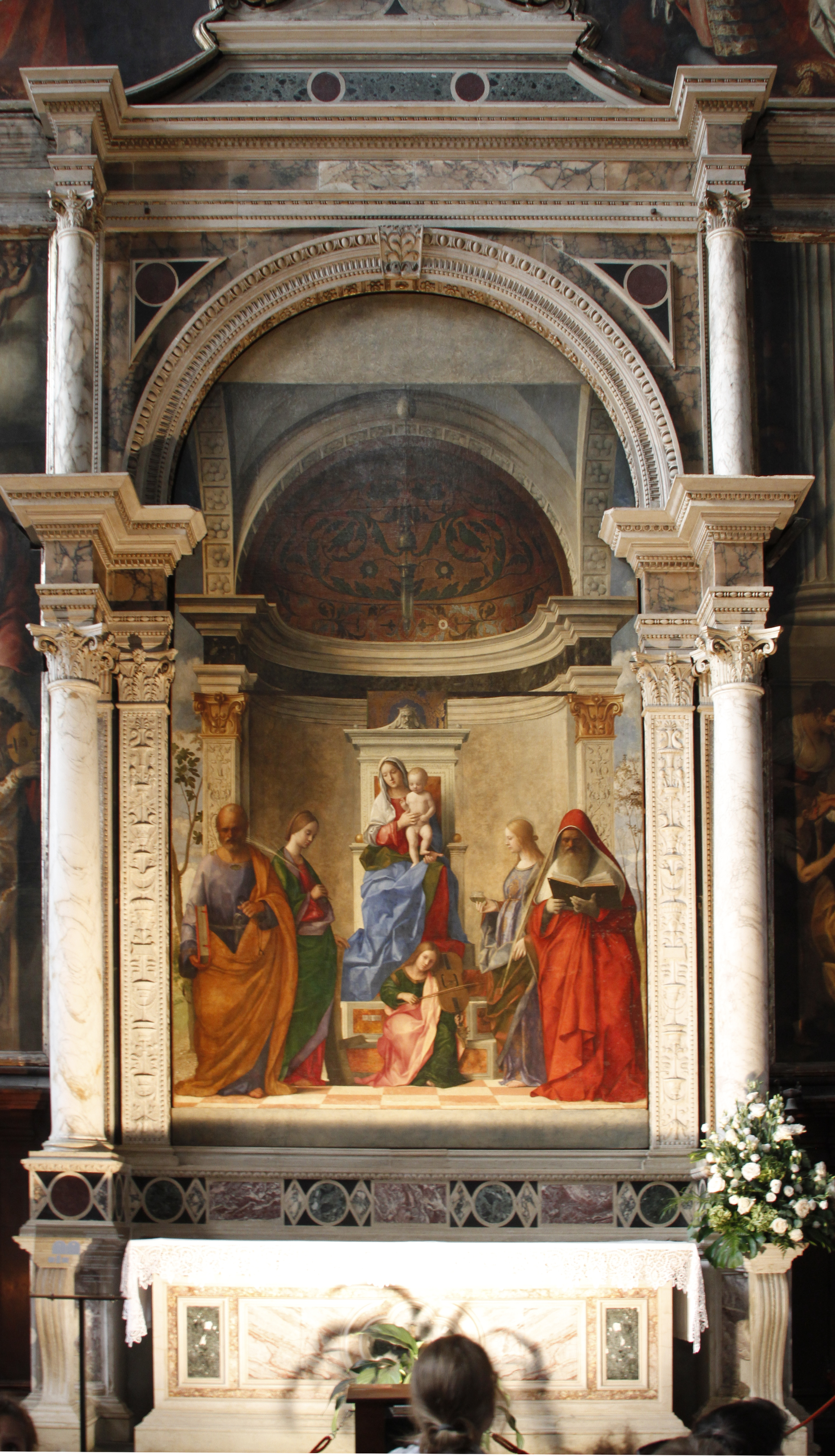
Architectural pillars framing the San Zaccaria Altarpiece

=== Architectural setting ===
One of the intriguing aspects about this altarpiece in particular is the architecture around it. The altarpiece and surrounding architecture was designed to make the work look as if it was a part of the building itself, having the architecture and art work together. The depth of the artwork created by linear perspective and the carved pillars surrounding the altarpiece make the frame appear as an entrance into the image itself. Bellini made sure to add ornamental delicacy, vibrant colors, and luxurious materials as a tribute to the church's architect, Mauro Codussi. Additionally, this coincides with Bellini's tendency to create soft and deep indoor settings.

=== Light and illusionism ===
Bellini adds scenes of nature on either side of the work itself. This was his first altarpiece that uses natural lighting inside an architectural setting. The addition of sunlight amplifies the brilliance of the colorful work, and the shadows cast behind the subjects adds to the three-dimensionality of the piece. However, the addition of the outdoors to both sides of the altarpiece takes away from the illusionistic continuation of the piece inside the church architecture. Lastly, the positioning of the subjects adds to the depth. The way the saints are lined up, almost creates an aisle to the center of the image which is the Virgin Mary holding the child of Christ.

Bellini also used metallic outlines and enamel to highlight certain aspects of his art. The outlines of the figures and objects are blurred in light and in shadows, yet each figure stays solidified and crisp. The altarpiece is similar to Frari Triptych because both indoor and outdoor perspectives were used in the piece; this is a common technique for Bellini.

== Theft and return ==
In 1787, Napoleon when sacked the city of Venice, he cut the San Zaccaria Altarpiece out of its frame, stealing it and taking it back to France with him; it was later returned to the Church of San Zaccaria.

== Gallery ==
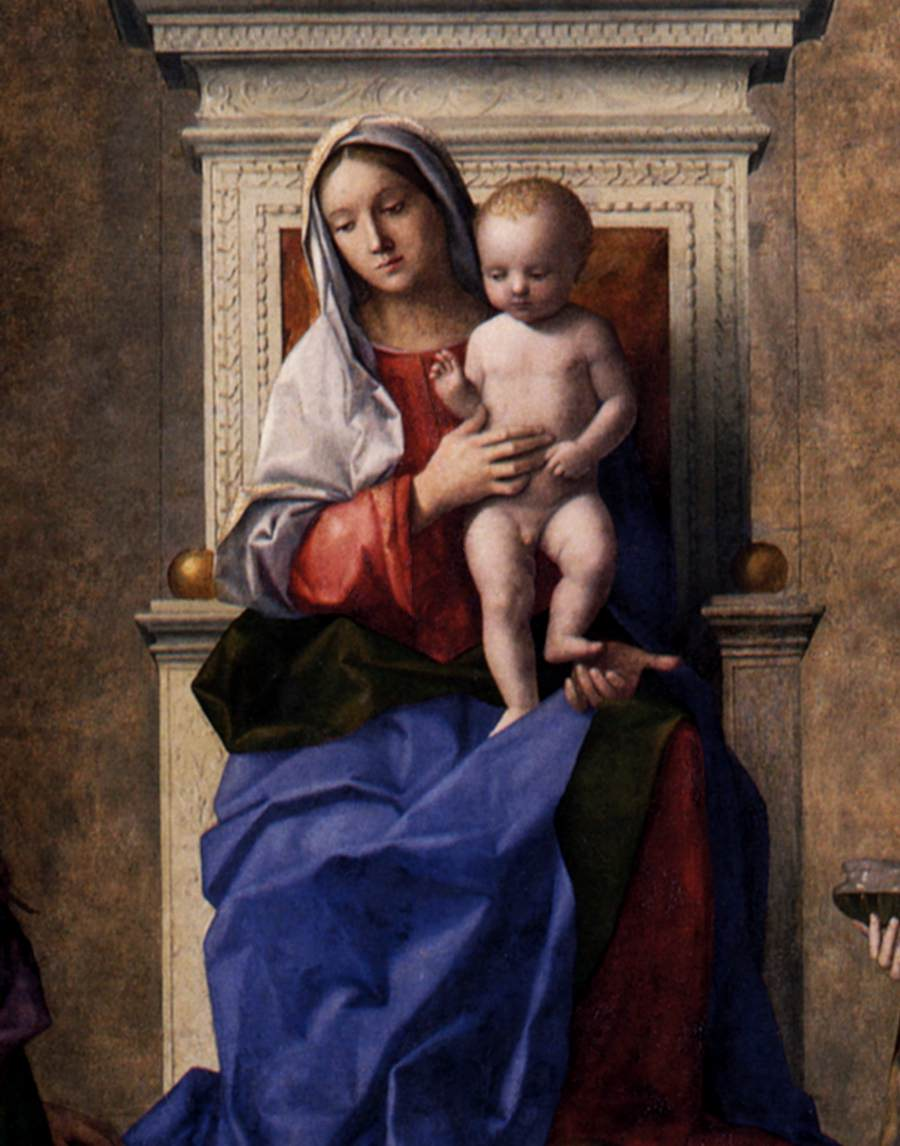
Virgin Mary holding the Son of Christ

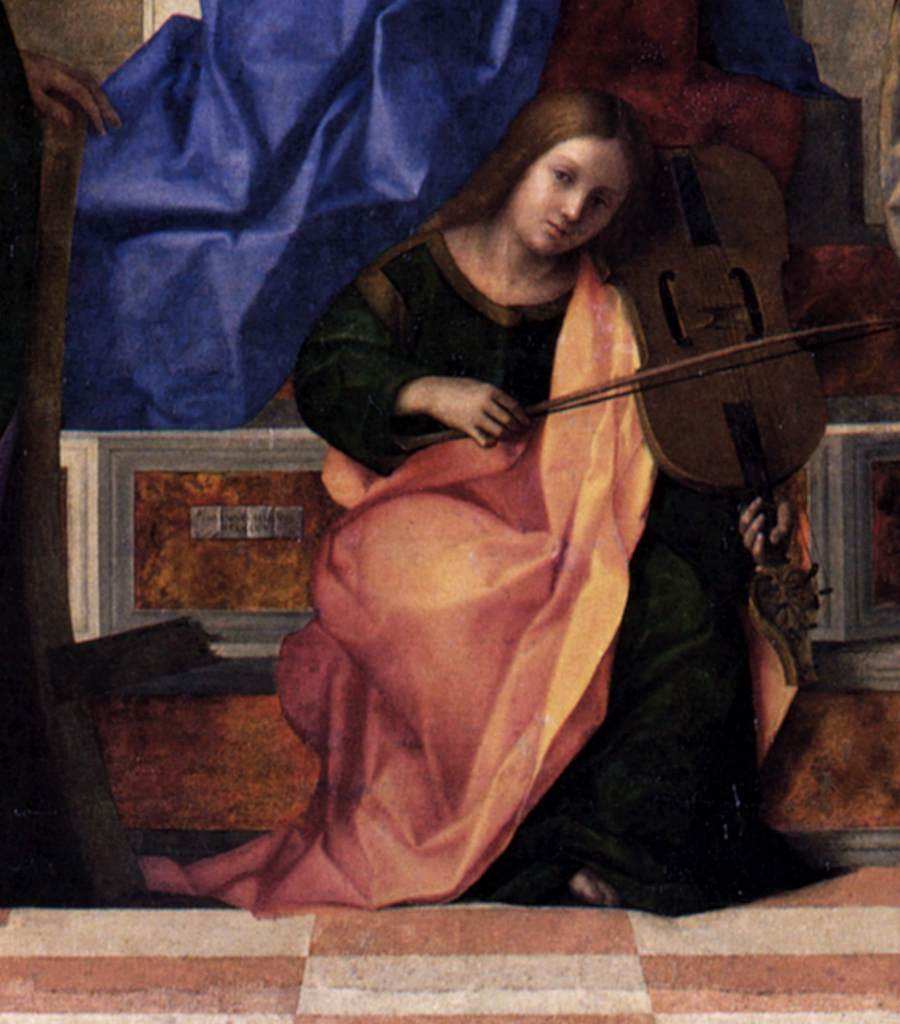
Angel playing lire de braccio

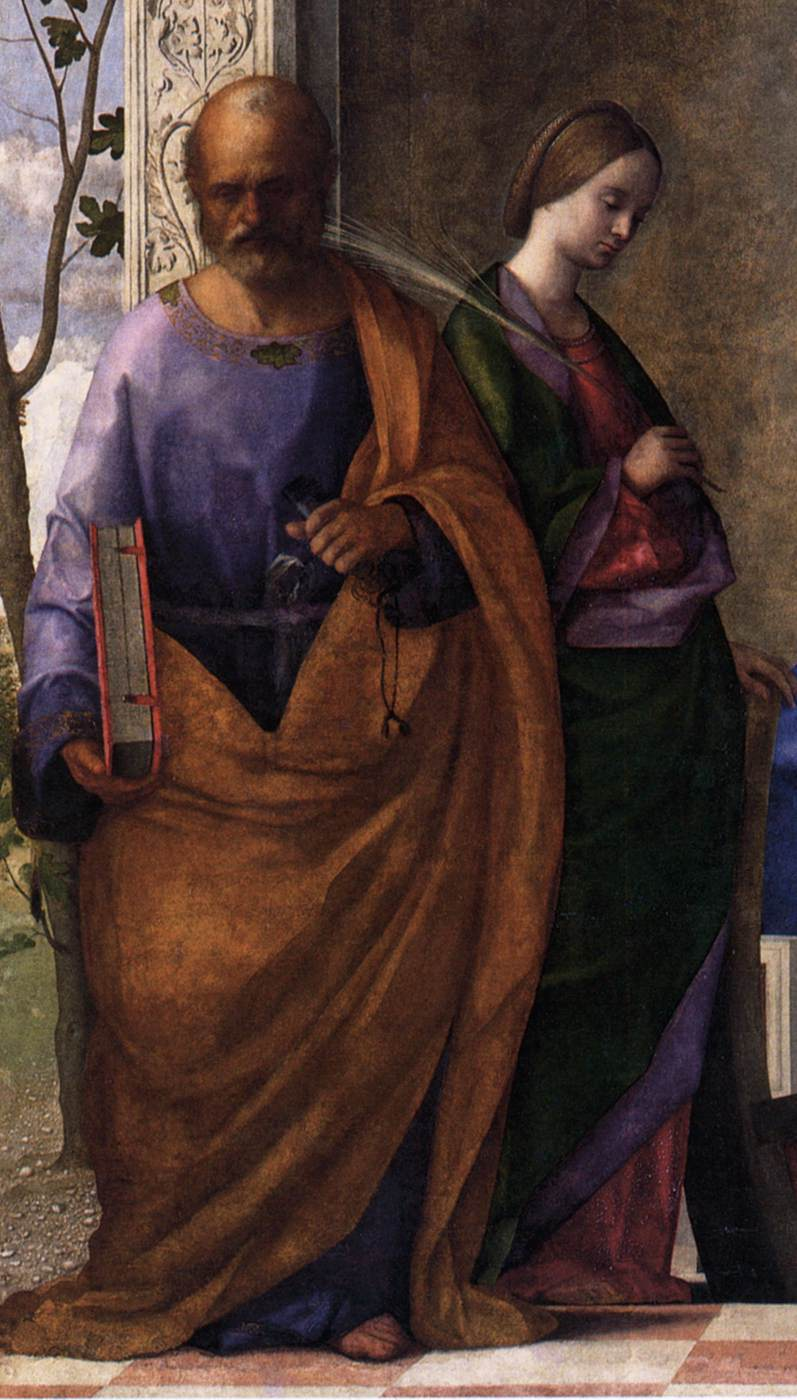
Saint Peter and Saint Catherine

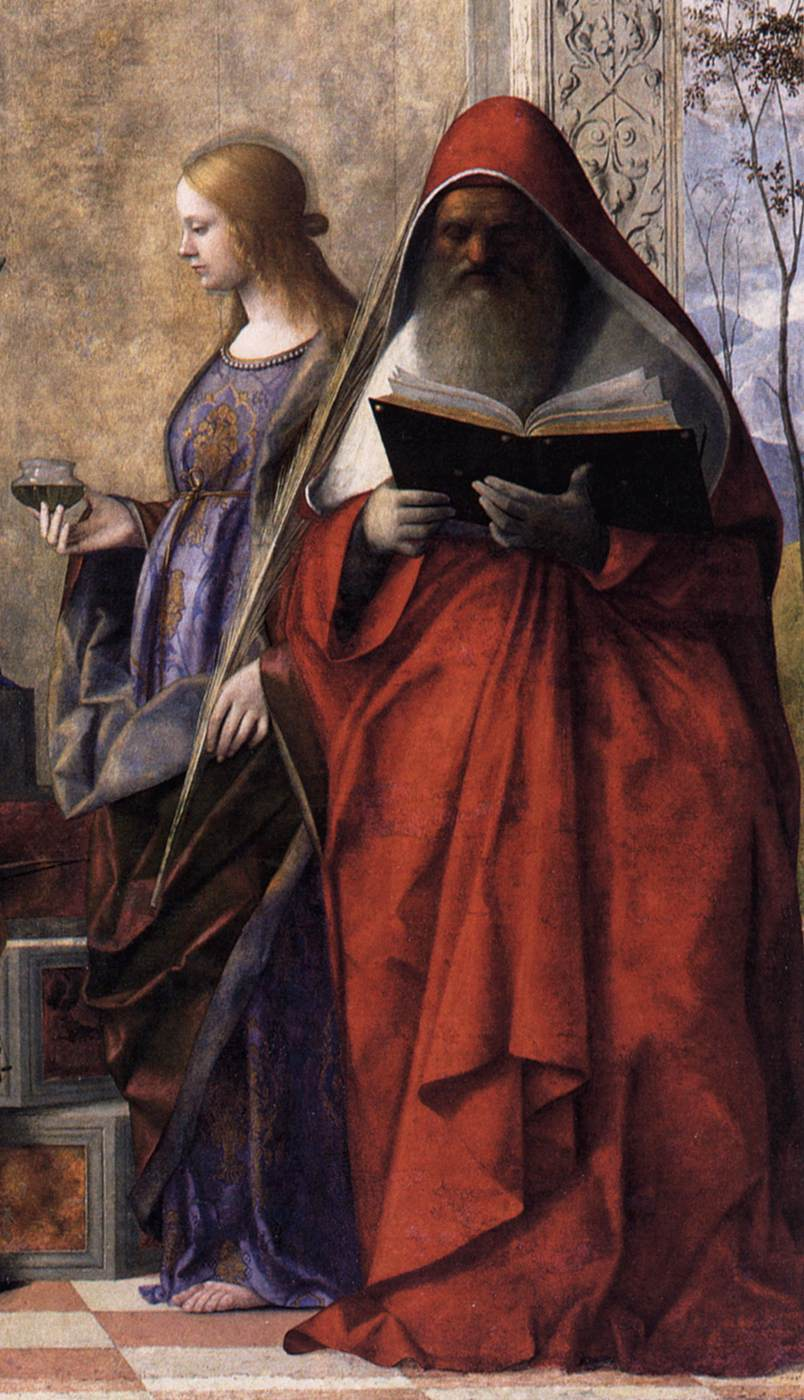
Saint Lucy and Saint Jerome

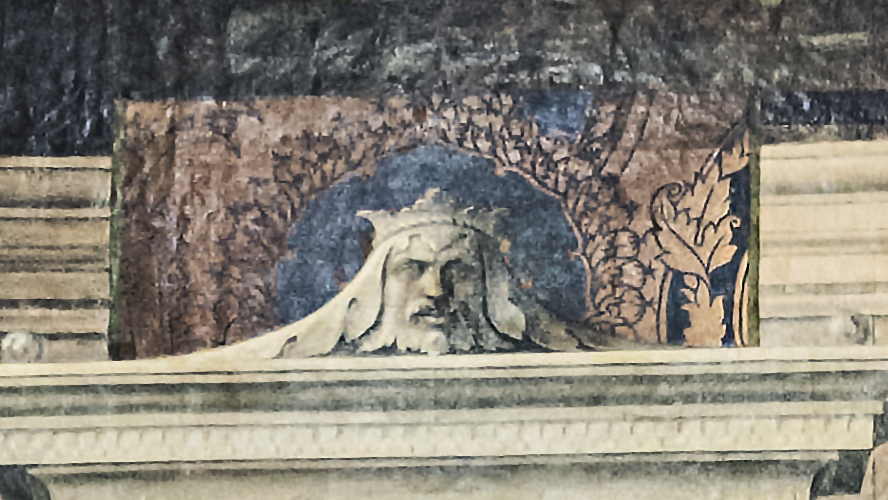
Leafage mask above throne of San Zaccaria Altarpiece

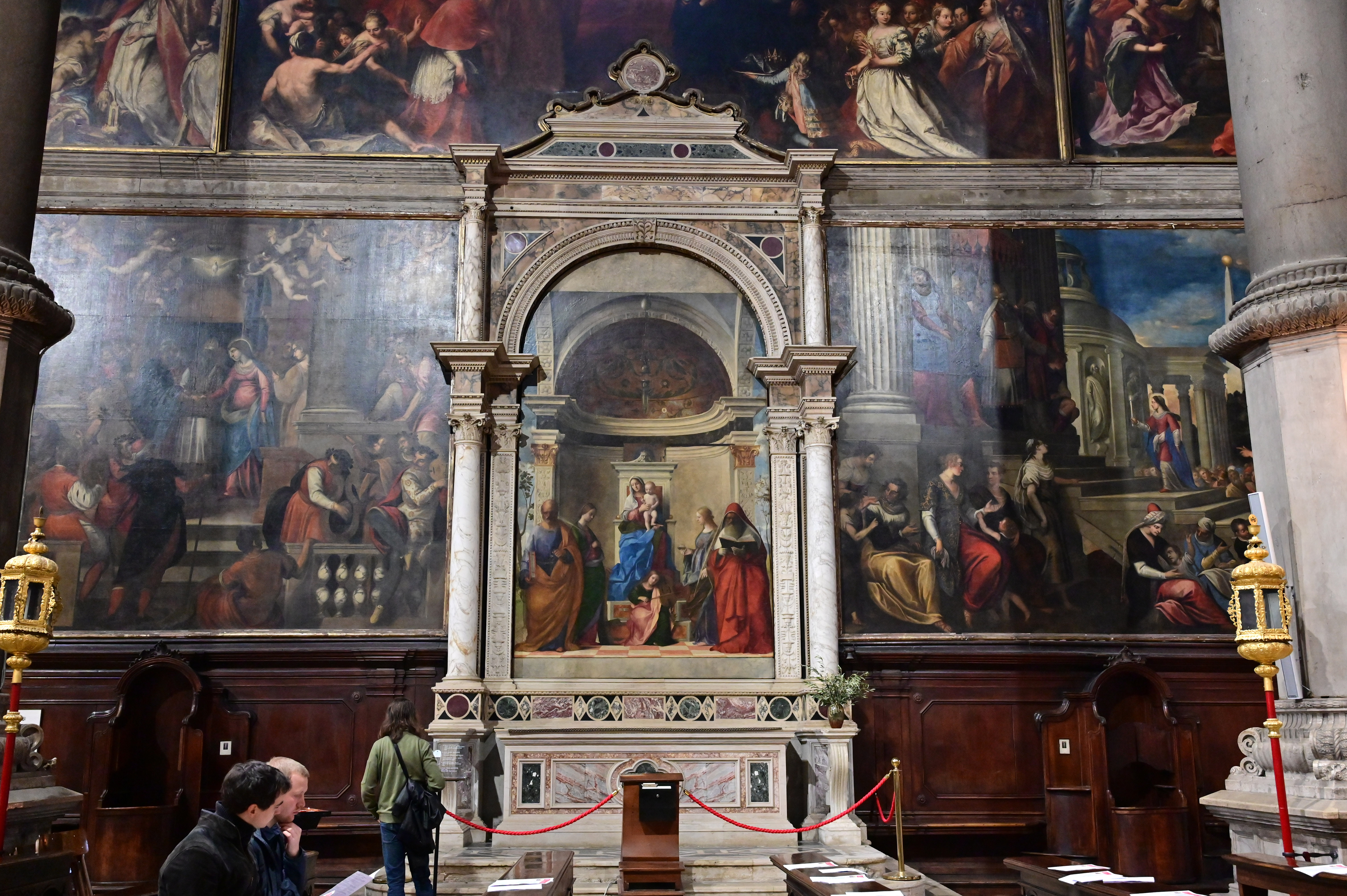
Bellini in Venice.

== See also ==
- San Zaccaria, Venice, a 1995 photograph by Thomas Struth
- Santa Cristina al Tiverone Altarpiece
- List of works by Giovanni Bellini

== Sources ==
- Olivari, Mariolina (2007). "Giovanni Bellini". Pittori del Rinascimento. Florence: Scala.
