= Breviary Hymns of the Rosary =

The Breviary Hymns of the Rosary were the four hymns that were sung during the Liturgy of the Hours for the Feast of the Rosary. Each hymn celebrates a category of mysteries of the rosary.

== See also ==
- Book of hours
