= San Zaccaria, Venice =

15th-century former monastic church in central Venice, Italy

San Zaccaria
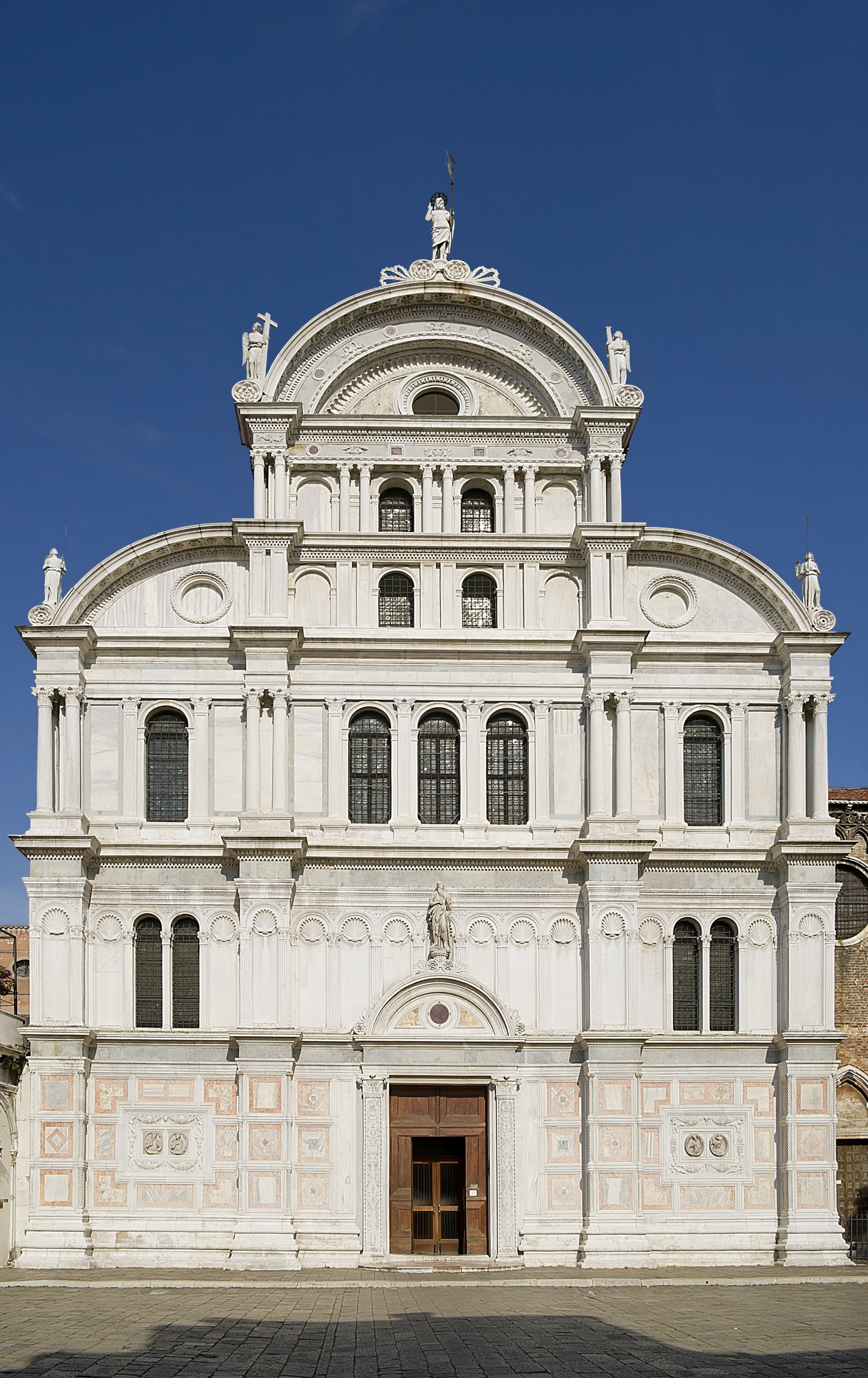
- Facade of the church

- Location within Venice Location within Italy

Religion
- Affiliation: Catholic Church
- Province: Venice

Location
- Location: Venice, Italy
- Interactive map of San Zaccaria
- Coordinates: 45°26′05″N 12°20′36″E

Architecture
- Completed: 15th-century

The Church of San Zaccaria is a 15th-century former monastic church in central Venice. It is a large edifice located in the Campo San Zaccaria, just off the waterfront to the southeast of Piazza San Marco and St Mark's Basilica. It is dedicated to Zechariah, father of John the Baptist and was built by the Republic of Venice.

== History ==
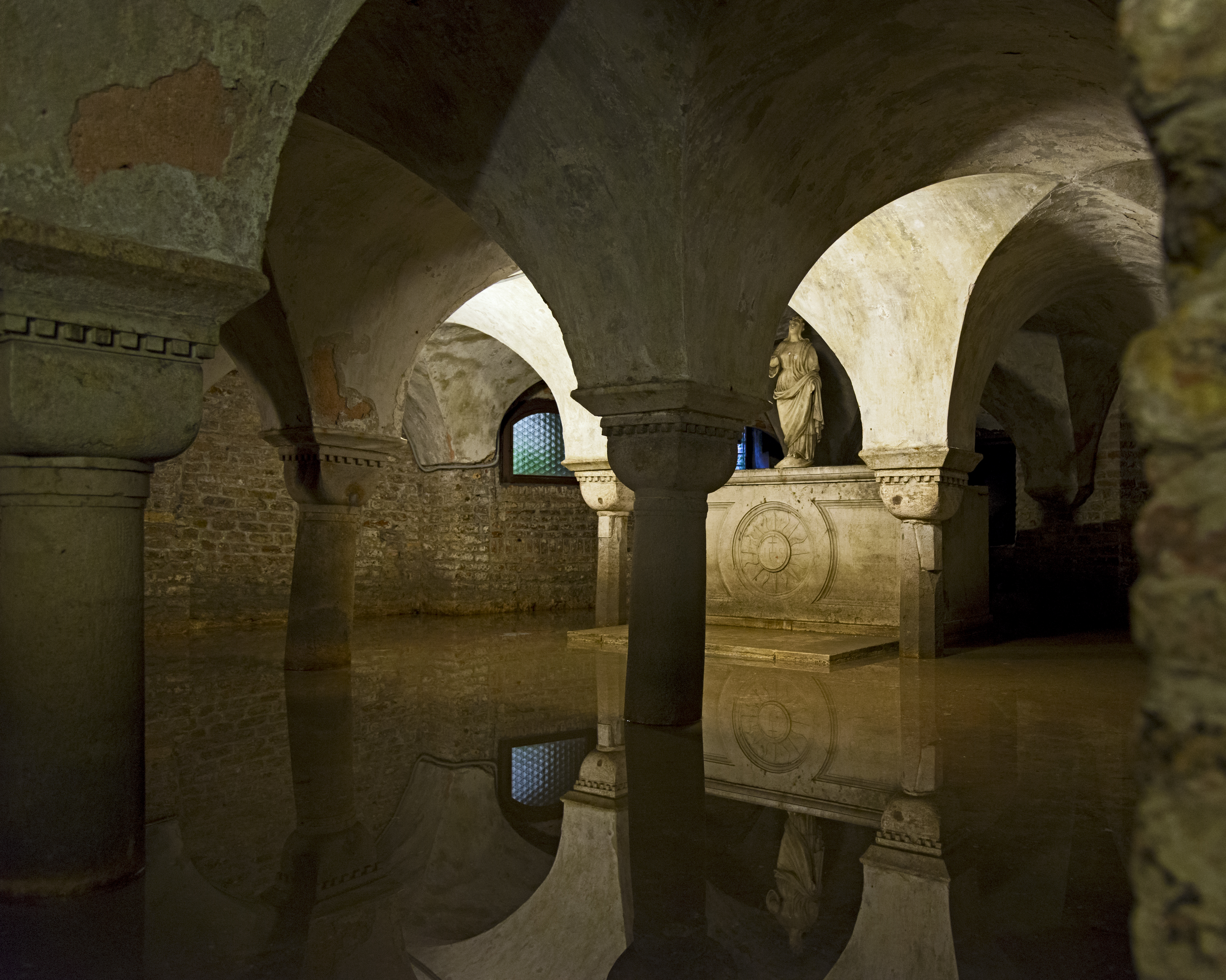
The crypt

The first church on the site was founded by Doge of Venice, Giustiniano Participazio, in the early 9th century to house the body of the saint to which it is dedicated, a gift of the Byzantine Emperor Leo V the Armenian, which it contains under the second altar on the right. The remains of various doges are buried in the crypt of the church. The original church was rebuilt in the 1170s (when the present campanile was built) and was replaced by a Gothic church in the 15th century. The remains of this building still stand, as the present church was built beside and not over it.

The present church was built between 1458 and 1515. Antonio Gambello was the original architect, who started the building in the Gothic style. Many years later, Mauro Codussi completed the upper part of the facade, with its arched windows and columns, and the upper parts of the interior in early Renaissance style. The facade is a harmonious Venetian mixture of late Gothic and Renaissance styles.

== Monastery ==
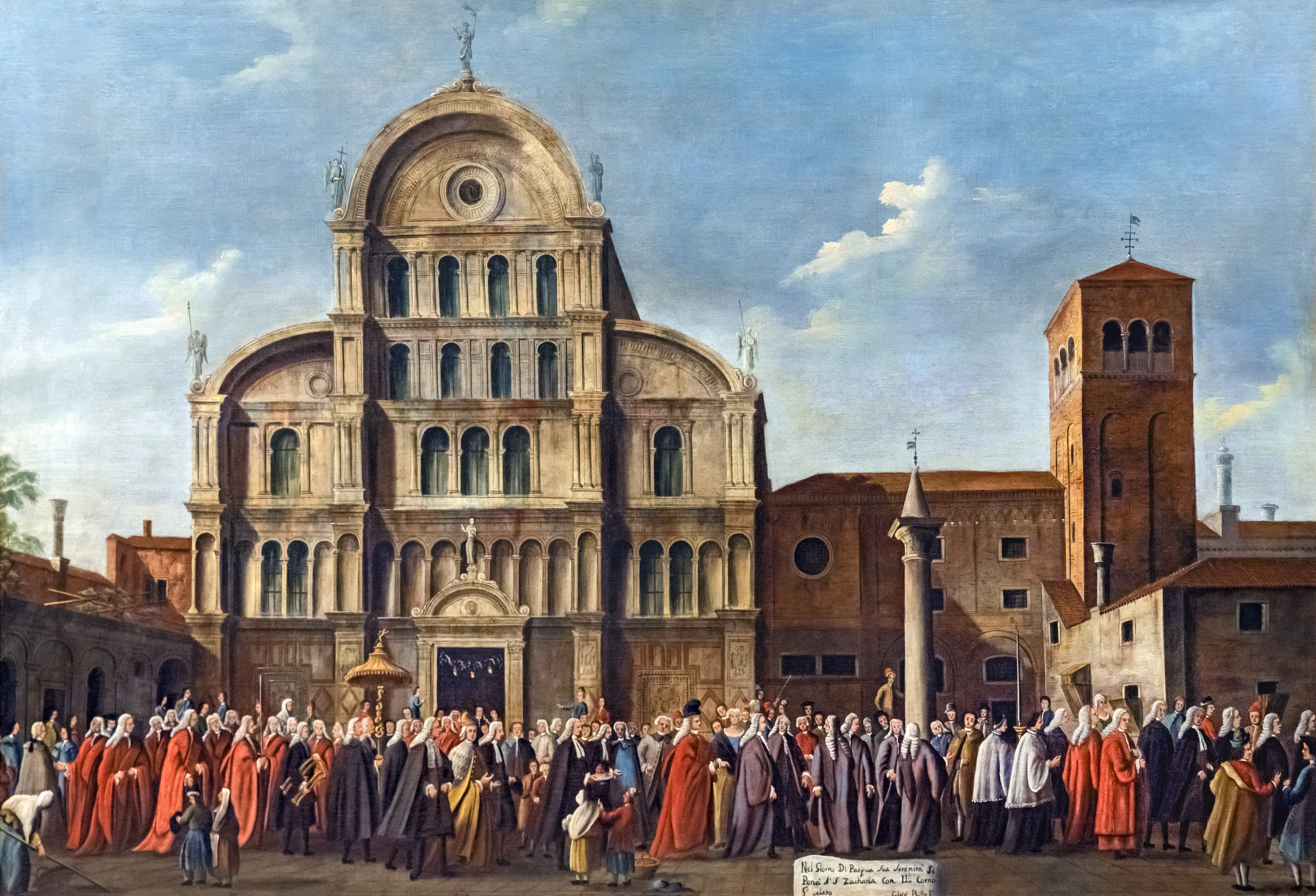
View of the church and adjoining monastery by Gabriele Bella (1790), in Pinacoteca Querini Stampalia

The church was initially attached to a Benedictine monastery of nuns, which was also founded by Participazio and various other doges of the family. The nuns of this monastery mostly came from prominent noble families in the city and had a reputation for laxness in their observance of the monastic enclosure. The abbess was usually related to the doge.

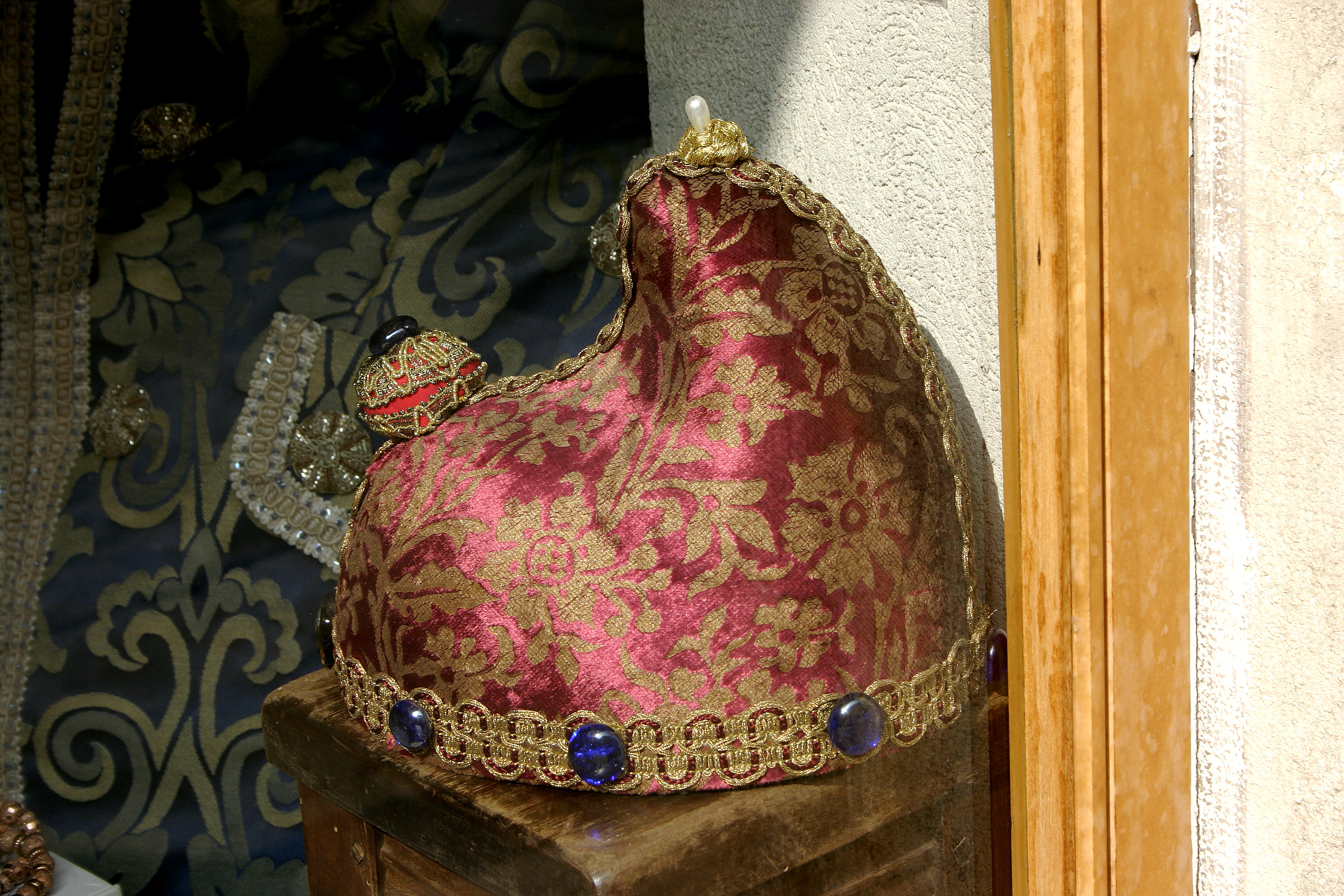
The corno ducale

In 855, Pope Benedict III took refuge in the monastery while fleeing the violence of Anastasius Bibliothecarius, whose election as Pope his supporters had challenged. Out of gratitude, Benedict III gave the nuns an extensive collection of relics, which was the foundation of a comprehensive collection for which the monastery was famed. Among these were those of Athanasius of Alexandria and a piece of the True Cross.

In 1105, a devastating fire destroyed the entire monastic complex. According to chronicles of the time, some one hundred nuns who had taken refuge in the monastery's cellars died from smoke inhalation.

Under the direction of Enrico Dandolo, the convent was reformed into a Cluniac house.

The monastery had the tradition of being visited by the doge and his entire court annually at Easter in a ceremony which included the presentation of the corno ducale, the insignia of his office. This tradition is said to have begun in the 12th century after the nuns had donated land for the building of a ducal chapel, now St Mark's Basilica, and ended only in 1797, at the end of the Republic, when the monastery was suppressed by the invading forces of Napoleon's army.

== Interior ==
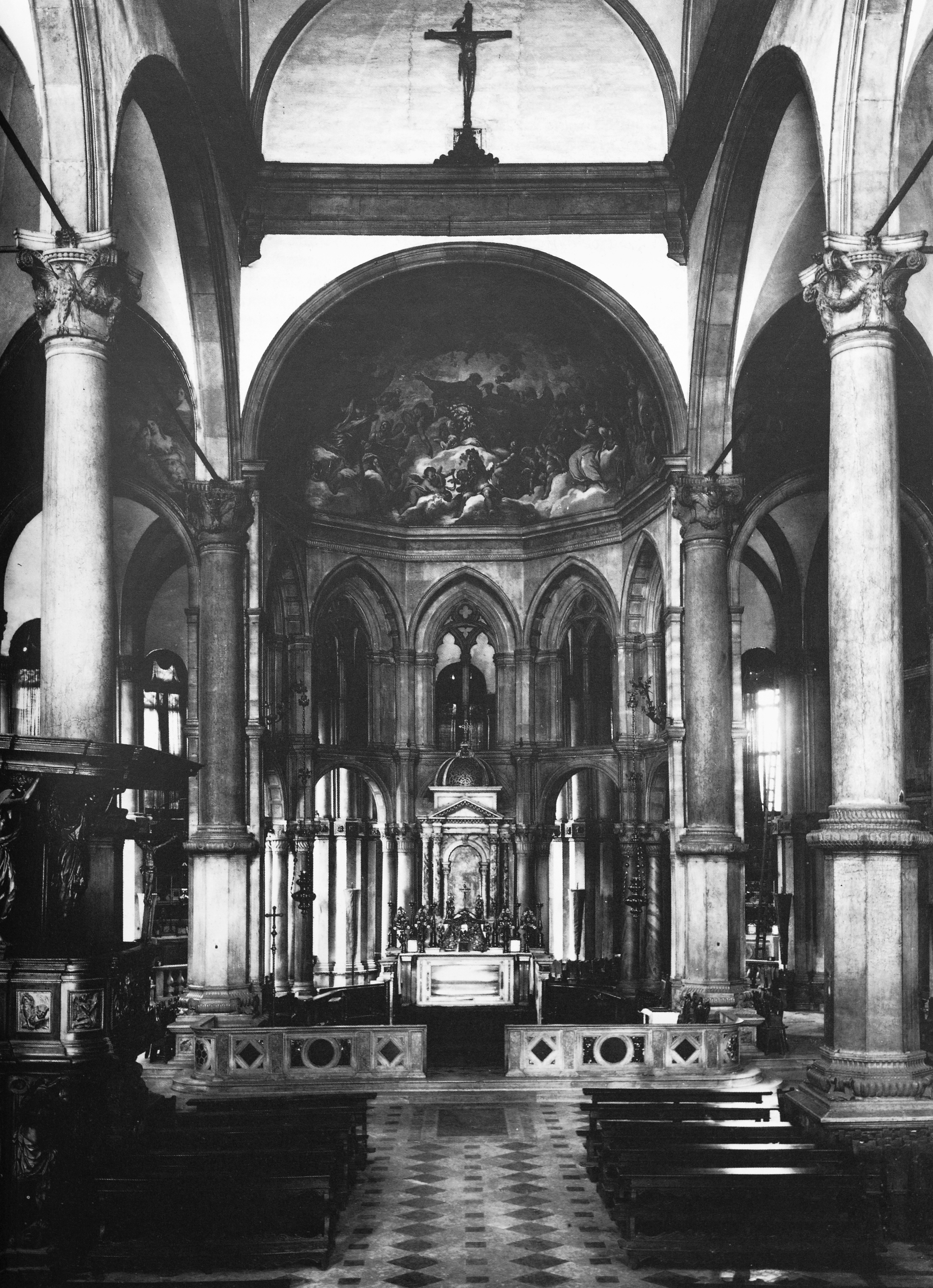
Interior San Zaccaria

The interior of the church has an apse surrounded by an ambulatory lit by tall Gothic windows, a typical feature of Northern European church architecture which is unique in Venice. Nearly every wall is covered with paintings by 17th and 18th-century artists. The church houses one of the most famous works by Giovanni Bellini, the San Zaccaria Altarpiece. The walls of the aisles and the chapels host paintings by other artists including Andrea del Castagno, Palma Vecchio, Tintoretto, Giuseppe Porta, Palma il Giovane, Antonio Vassilacchi, Anthony van Dyck, Andrea Celesti, Antonio Zanchi, Antonio Balestra, Angelo Trevisani and Giovanni Domenico Tiepolo.

The artist Alessandro Vittoria is buried in the church, his tomb marked by a self-portrait bust.

The church organ was built by Gaetano Callido in 1790.
