= Frari Triptych =

Altarpiece by Giovanni Bellini

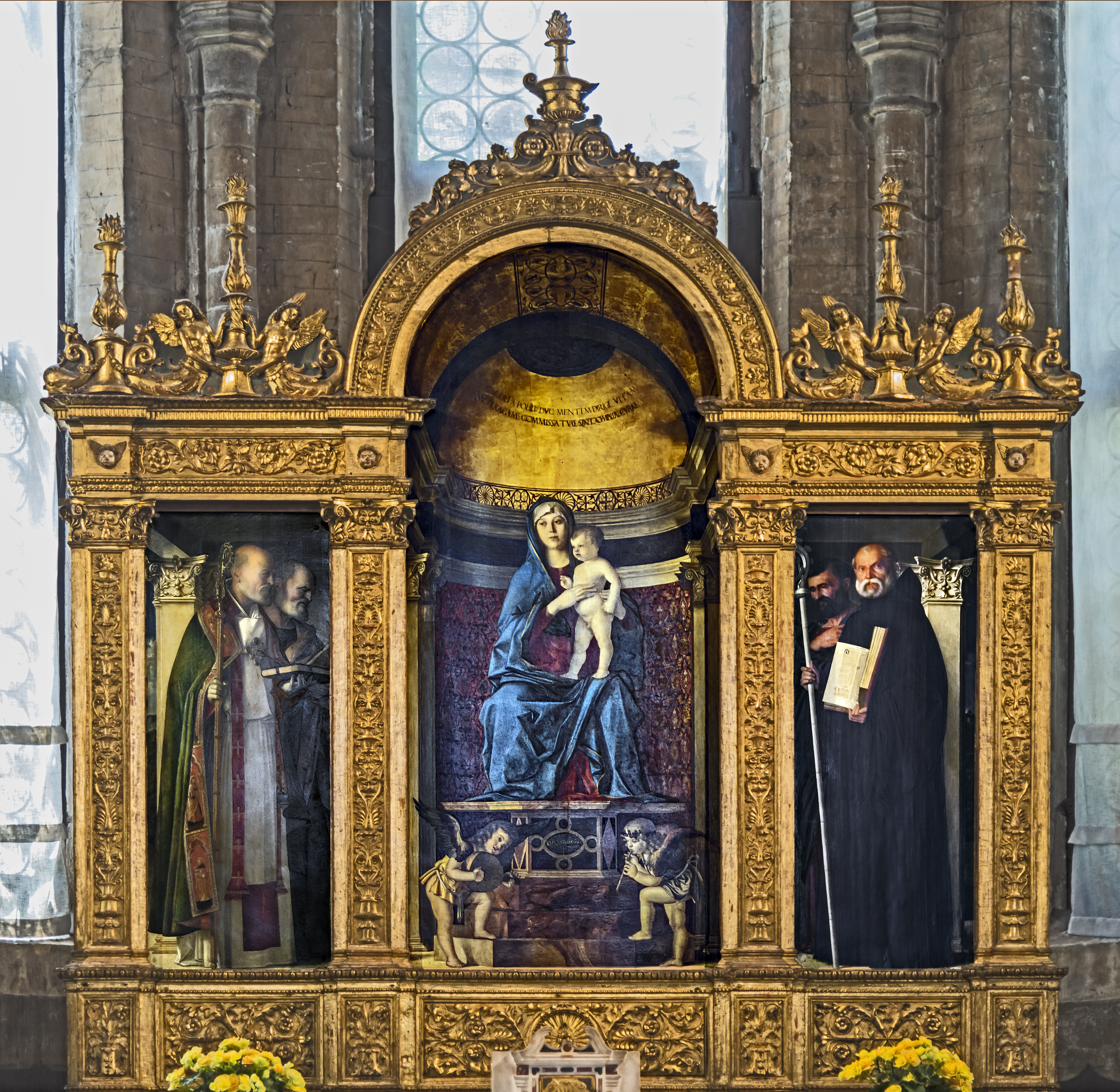
- Artist: Giovanni Bellini
- Year: 1488
- Medium: Oil on panel
- Dimensions: 184 cm × 79 cm (72 in × 31 in)
- Location: basilica di Santa Maria Gloriosa dei Frari, Venice

The Frari Triptych or Pesaro Triptych is a 1488 oil-on-panel triptych painting by the Italian Renaissance master Giovanni Bellini. It is signed and dated 1488 on the centre of the Virgin Mary's throne, though it may have taken several years to produce, meaning he started it in 1485. On the reverse is a label dating its completion more precisely, to 15 February 1488. It is in the basilica di Santa Maria Gloriosa dei Frari in Venice.

Its central scene is the Madonna and Child enthroned with two angel musicians, flanked to the left by saint Nicholas of Bari and Saint Peter and to the right by Saint Mark (patron of Venice) and Saint Benedict. The work's division into compartments is rather old-fashioned and may have been explicitly demanded by the commissioner, but Bellini uses this to his advantage, integrating the painted architecture with the frame, which he designed himself. This develops the illusionism of his San Giobbe Altarpiece, again placing the Virgin in a deep blue mantle on a high marble throne, using a golden light and a Byzanto-Venetian-style apse. To the sides thin strips of landscape suggest a vast space behind the work, whilst the trompe-l'œil apse behind the Virgin bears an inscription reading IANUA CERTA POLI DUC MENTEM DIRIGE VITAM: QUAE PERAGAM COMMISSA TUAE SINT OMNIA CURAE ("Certain gate of heaven, guide [my] mind, direct [my] life: may everything I do be entrusted to your care").

== See also ==
- List of works by Giovanni Bellini

== Gallery ==
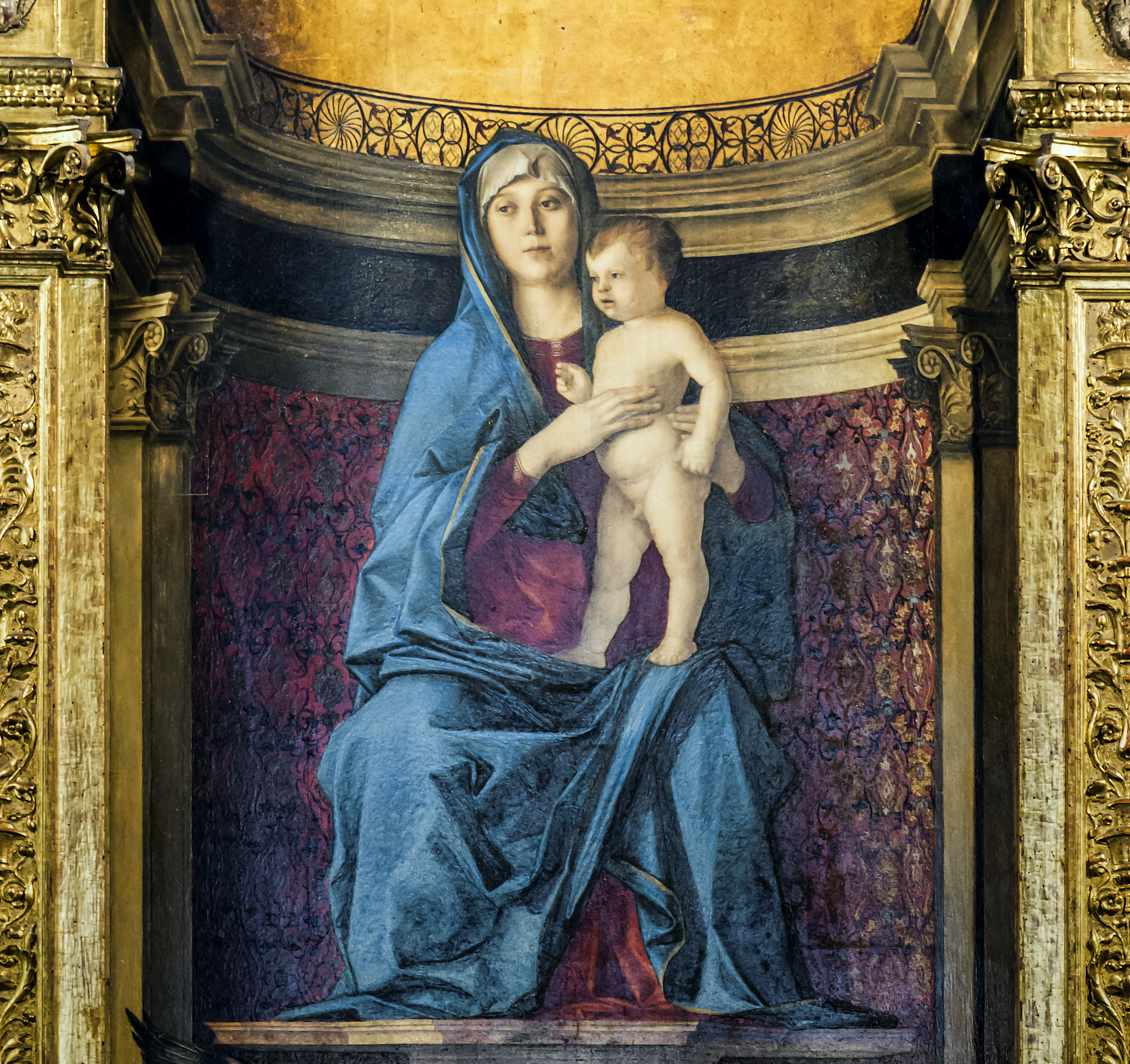
Central panel

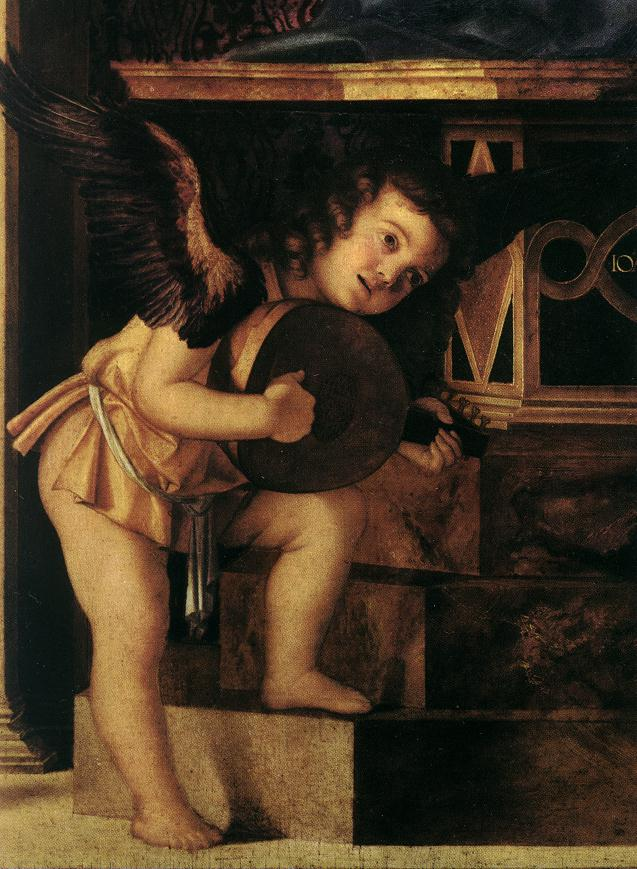
Angel

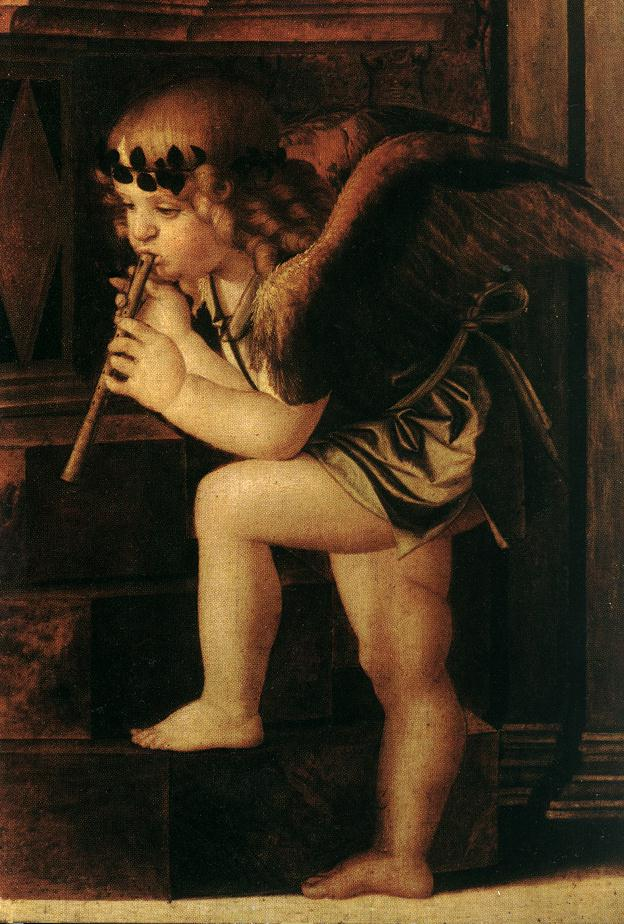
Angel

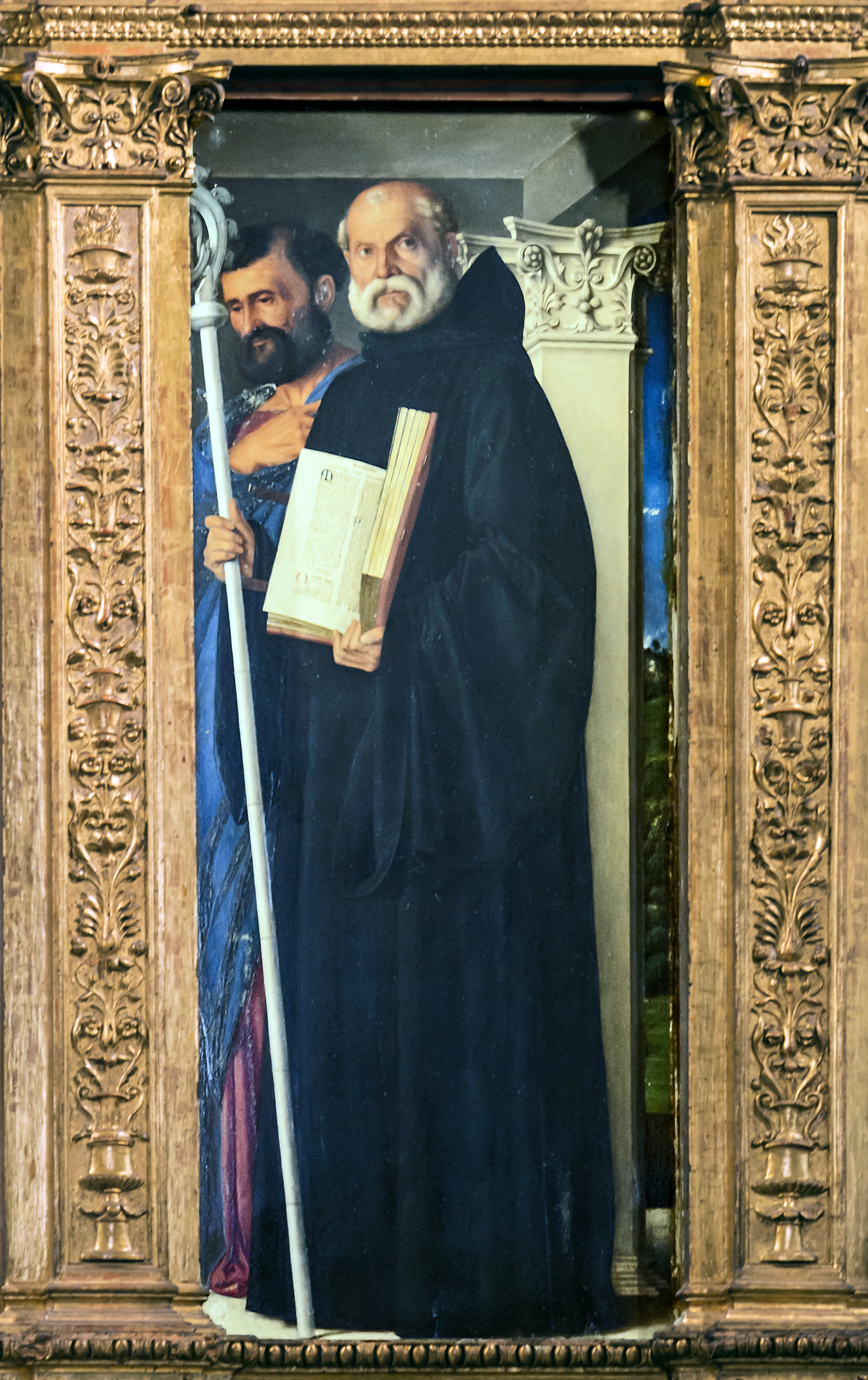
Right-hand panel
