= Jean-Louis de Marne =

French painter

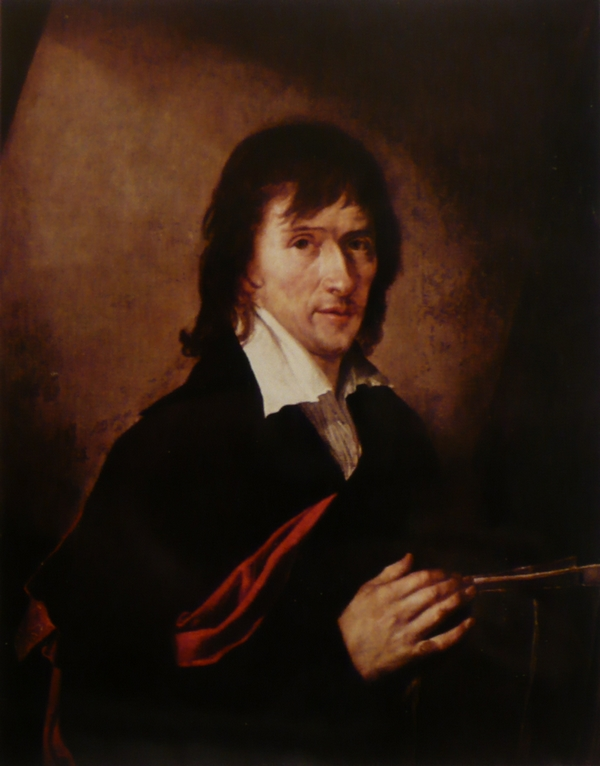
J.-L. de Marne.jpg

Jean-Louis de Marne (1752-24 March 1829) was a French painter.

== Biography ==
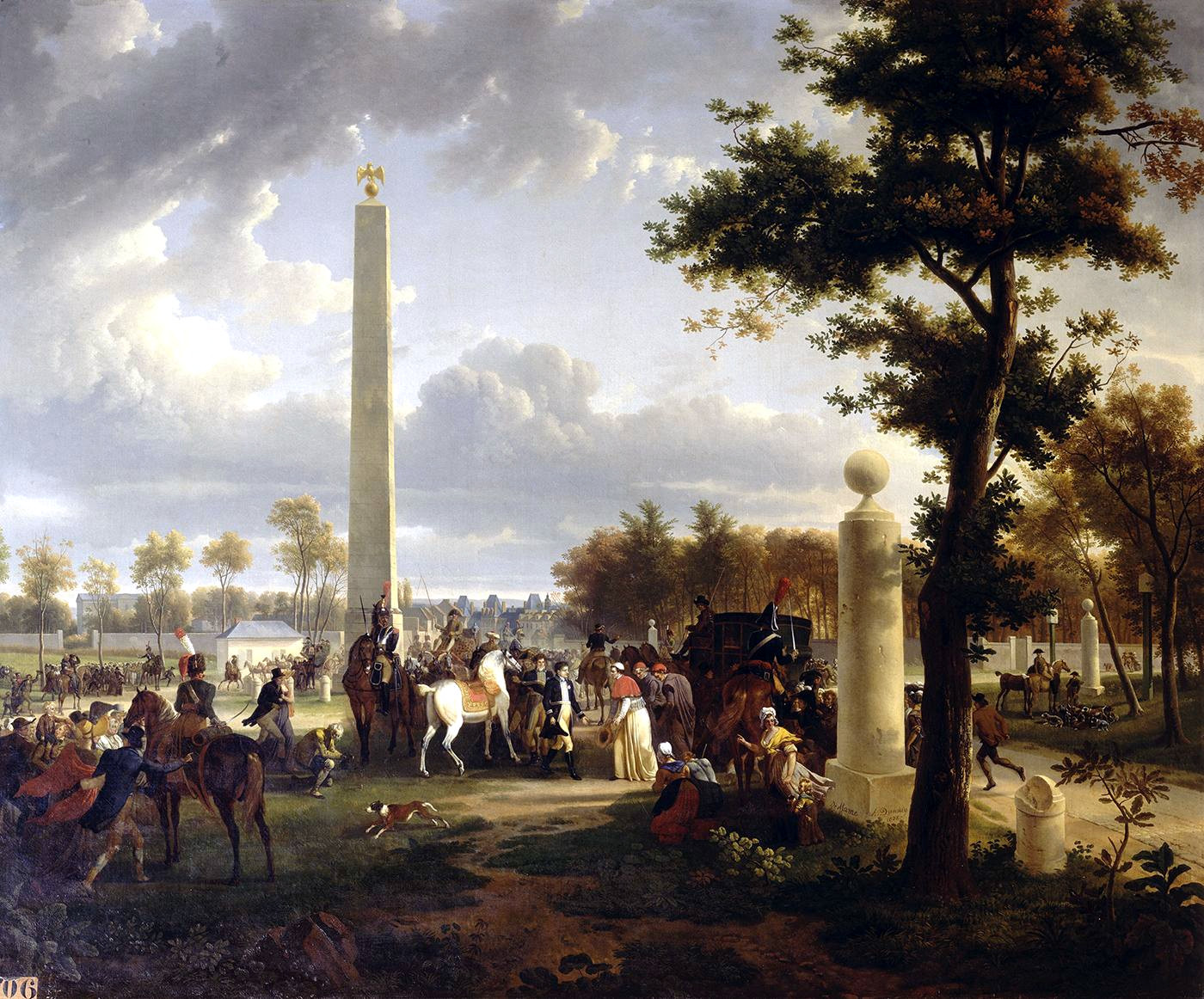
Entrevue de Napoléon et du pape Pie VII

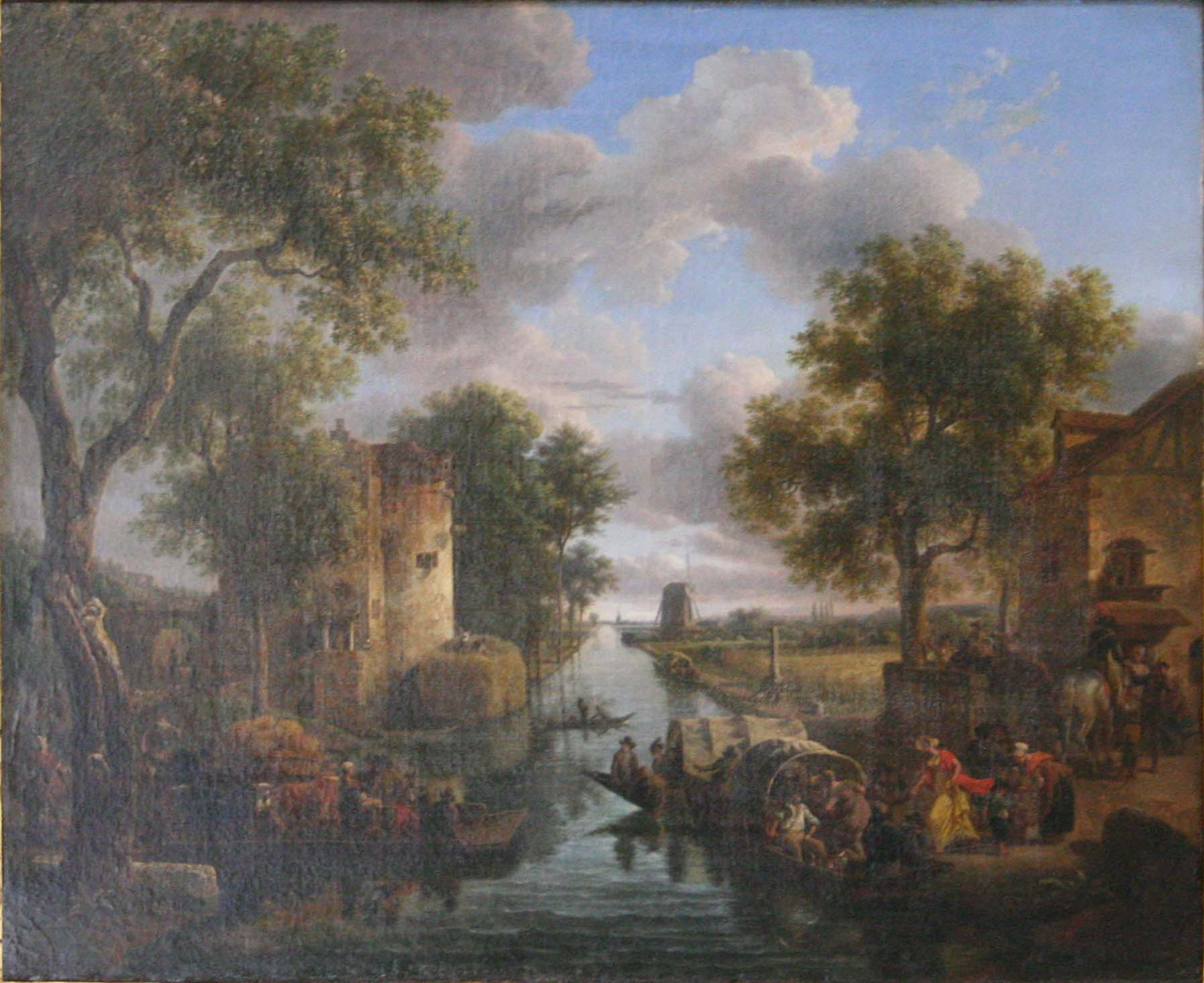
A canal

Born at Brussels in 1752, pupil of Gabriel Briard, Jean-Louis de Marne died at Batignolles near Paris on March 24, 1829.

He went to Paris at the age of 12 after the death of his father, who had been in Brussels as an officer in the service of the Emperor of Austria. Essayed first, historical subjects, then landscape of the classic and severe order. He had more success with paintings into which animals were introduced and with genre pieces.

He concentrated on landscape and genre painting, in which he was greatly influenced by such 17th century Dutch masters as Aelbert Cuyp, the van Ostade brothers, Paulus Potter, Adriaen van de Velde and Karel Dujardin, all artists enjoying a tremendous vogue and high prices in Paris at that time. His realist landscapes also meet Lazare Bruandet or Georges Michel paintings. On March 27, 1806, an official letter of Vivant Denon, general director of the Napoleon museum, informed him that the Emperor had chosen him to paint the Entrevue de Napoléon et de Pie VII dans la forêt de Fontainebleau, le 24 novembre 1804, 1808, national museum of Palace of Fontainebleau.
J.-L. de Marne was made an associate of the Académie Royale in 1783 but did not become a full member. He seems to have cared little for official honours and later, in 1815, was unwilling to seek membership of the Institut de France. He was, however, awarded the Légion d'honneur by Charles X of France on April 23, 1828.
His best period was between 1792 and 1808.
