= Ema Gordon Klabin Cultural Foundation =

Art museum in São Paulo, Brazil

Coordinates: 23°34′25″S 46°40′32″W

Fundação Cultural Ema Gordon Klabin
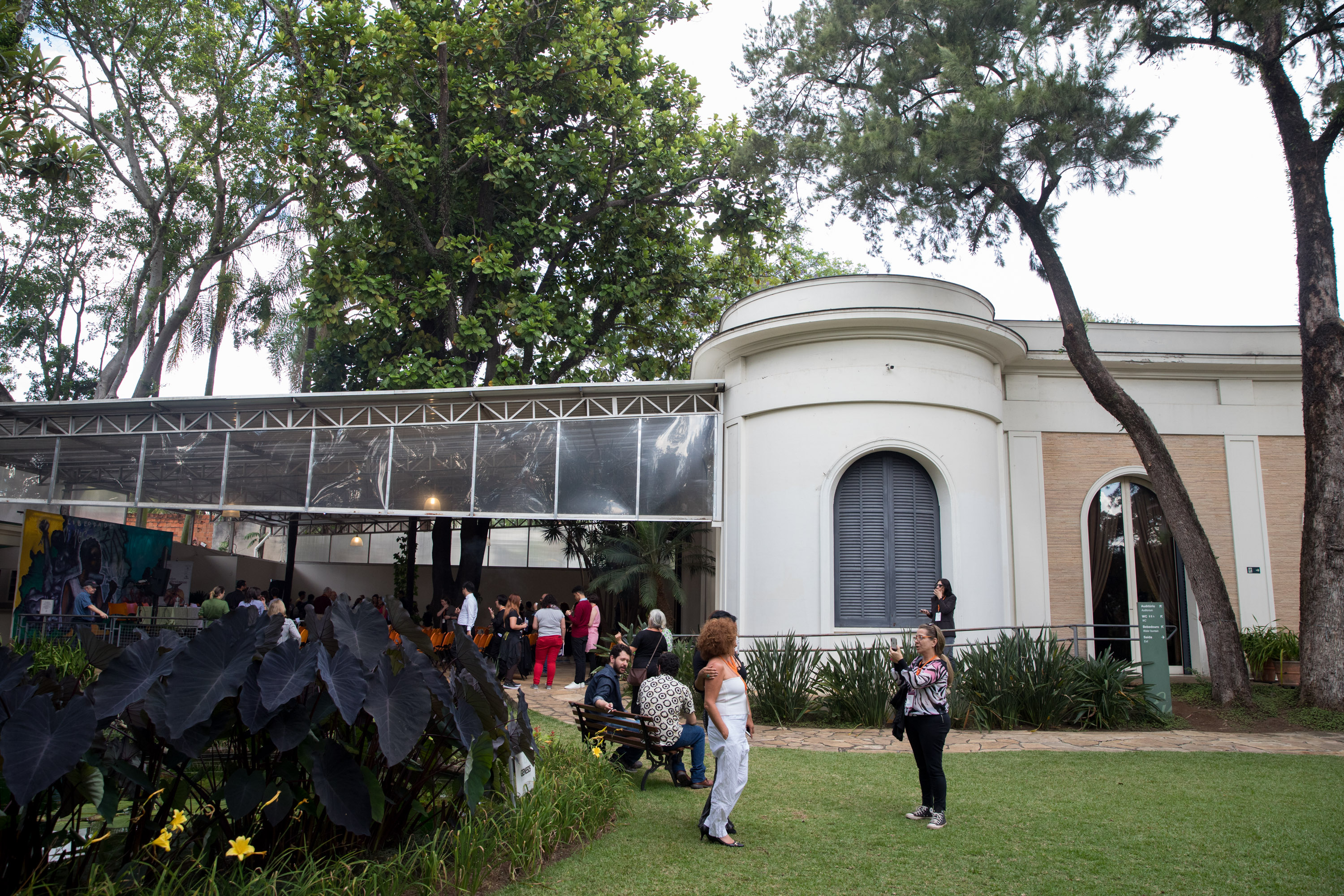
- Established: 1978
- Location: São Paulo, Brazil
- Director: Celso Lafer
- Curator: Paulo de Freitas Costa
- Public transit access: Fradique Coutinho
- Website: www.emaklabin.org.br/

The Ema Gordon Klabin Cultural Foundation (in Portuguese Fundação Cultural Ema Gordon Klabin) is an art museum located in the city of São Paulo, Brazil. Officially established in 1978, it is a not-for-profit private institution, legally declared as an organization of federal public interest. It was created by the Brazilian collector and philanthropist Ema Gordon Klabin (1907–1994), with the purpose of preserving and displaying her art collection, as well as promoting cultural, artistic and scientific activities. The foundation is headquartered in Ema's former house in Jardins district, specially designed by architect Alfredo Ernesto Becker in the 1950s to hold her collection. The house is surrounded by a 4,000 square meters garden projected by Brazilian landscape architect Roberto Burle Marx.

The Foundation's collection includes more than 1,500 pieces, covering some of the periods of Western art history, from Greek and Etruscan civilizations to European masters, with important works from the Dutch, Flemish, Italian and French schools, as well as works from Asian cultures, African and pre-Columbian art. Brazilian art is also outlined in the collection, which includes examples ranging from colonial period to the first generations of modernists. The Foundation's library holds an assemblage of rare books, ranging from illuminated manuscripts to incunables.

== History ==
=== Ema Klabin ===
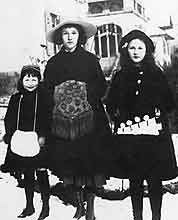
Ema Klabin (right) with her older sister, Eva, and her younger sister, Mina, in Switzerland (1915).

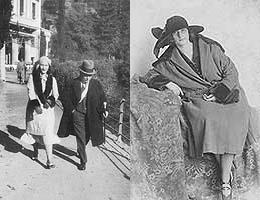
Ema walking with her father in Italy (left). Ema in Berlin, in 1925.

Born in Rio de Janeiro in 1907, Ema Gordon Klabin was the second daughter of the Lithuanian immigrants Fanny and Hessel Klabin. Her father was one of the founders of Klabin, a leading paper manufacturer company in Brazil. She spent a great part of her childhood in Europe, making frequent travels to her homeland. Taken by surprise by the World War I, the family, which had been living in Germany since 1913, was forced to move to Switzerland, where they stayed until 1919. During this period, Ema obtained her only formal education. After returning to Brazil, she only studied with private teachers, since at that time there were no conditions for women to study, except at the Catholic schools, which she could not attend due to her Jewish origin. She grew as a great appreciator of music and art, an avid reader, and frequenter of concerts, theater, opera and ballet. She soon developed great interest in collecting. Her first acquisitions were oriental rugs, porcelain and silverware.

After Hessel Klabin's death in 1946, Ema and her sister, Eva, became heiresses of the family's fortune. Ema also became her father's successor at the company council. She never married nor had children, dedicating herself exclusively to business affairs, philanthropic and cultural activities. As her sister, Ema also continued to expand her art collection, making frequent travels to Europe and the United States to acquire new items. In 1948, she commissioned the architect Alfredo Ernesto Becker to project her a new house in a plot of land she inherited from her father, located in the Jardins district, in order to hold her growing collection. Some time later, she would order the construction of a winter country house in Campos do Jordão, when there was no space left to hold her frequent acquisitions.

Ema became significantly involved in the cultural life of São Paulo. She served as a member of the boards of trustees of the São Paulo Museum of Art, the São Paulo Museum of Modern Art and the São Paulo Art Biennial. She collaborated at the creation of the Lasar Segall Museum and the Magda Tagliaferro Foundation, and was also a member and supporter of the Sociedade de Cultura Artística and of the São Paulo Philarmonic Orchestra. Among her philanthropic activities, her most significant work was the donation of the amount necessary to buy the lot where the Albert Einstein Hospital would be built, as well as organizing fund-raising activities to help finance its construction. She also collaborated with the Association of Parents and Friends of the Handicapped of São Paulo (APAE), the Association for Assistance to Children with Birth Defects (AACD) and the Cancer Hospital.

In the 1970s, childless, Ema began to concern herself about the future of her collection. One of her first ideas was to donate major part of it to Brazilian museums. But after the tragic fire which destroyed almost the entire collection of the Rio de Janeiro Museum of Modern Art in 1978, she decided, as her sister, to create a foundation with the purpose of keeping the collection together and turning her house into a museum open to public visitation after her death. Ema died in 1994, aged 86.

=== The Foundation ===
The Foundation was officially registered in 1978. After Ema's death, her house remained closed for three years, until the end of 1996, when the architect Paulo de Freitas Costa was invited to set up a team to begin the activities and was later named curator of the institution. The work of researching and cataloging the collection began in 1997, conducted through consultations with specialists and institutions within Brazil and abroad, aiming to solve questions related to identification, attribution and authenticity of the pieces, beside determining their artistic and historic value. Restoration actions were also carried out in many pieces through agreements or collaboration of other institutions. The definition that best applies to the Ema Klabin Foundation is that of a "house-museum", where a "closed collection" is permanently arranged according to the taste and wish of its creator, thus preserving the original character, idiosyncrasy and personality of the collector.

In recent years, the Ema Klabin Foundation has been making efforts at disseminating information about the collection, including by lending pieces for temporary exhibitions held in museums of São Paulo, Rio de Janeiro and Porto Alegre. Pieces of the collection have also been shown in foreign exhibitions, such as Brazil through European Eyes, held in London, Brésil Baroque, held at the Petit Palais in Paris, Chaïm Soutine, held in the Musée d'Art Moderne de Céret and the Jewish Museum Vienna, and the retrospective exhibition Lasar Segall: un expressionista brasileño held at Museo de Arte Moderno in Mexico City and the Latin American Art Museum of Buenos Aires.

=== The house ===
The headquarters of the Ema Klabin Foundation is located in a 4,000 square meters lot at Jardim Europa district, an upscale subdivision designed by Hipólito Pujol Júnior at the end of the 1920s, following the model of the British-style garden-cities in the adjoining district of Jardim América, projected by the English urban planner Richard Barry Parker in the previous decade. The house has a floor space of 900 square meters and was projected in the late 1940s by architect Alfredo Ernesto Becker. Its gardens were designed by Roberto Burle Marx.

The house presents an eclectic style, blending modern and classic elements. It seems to be inspired by European palace pavilions, particularly by the Sanssouci Palace in Potsdam, visited by Ema in her childhood and teenage years. It is a single floor building organized in a long semicircular gallery, facing the garden, around which all the rooms are distributed. Although it presents an impressive scale, as seen by the nearly five-meter-high ceilings, it possesses relatively few rooms.

== Collection ==
=== African art ===
The collection of African art comprises religious and ritual objects, executed in wood, ivory and bronze by distinct Ethnic groups of Western Africa, such as Ashanti, Bambara, Yoruba, Mossi, Dan, Baoulé, Bakongo and Bakuba, most of which dating back to the late 19th and early 20th centuries.

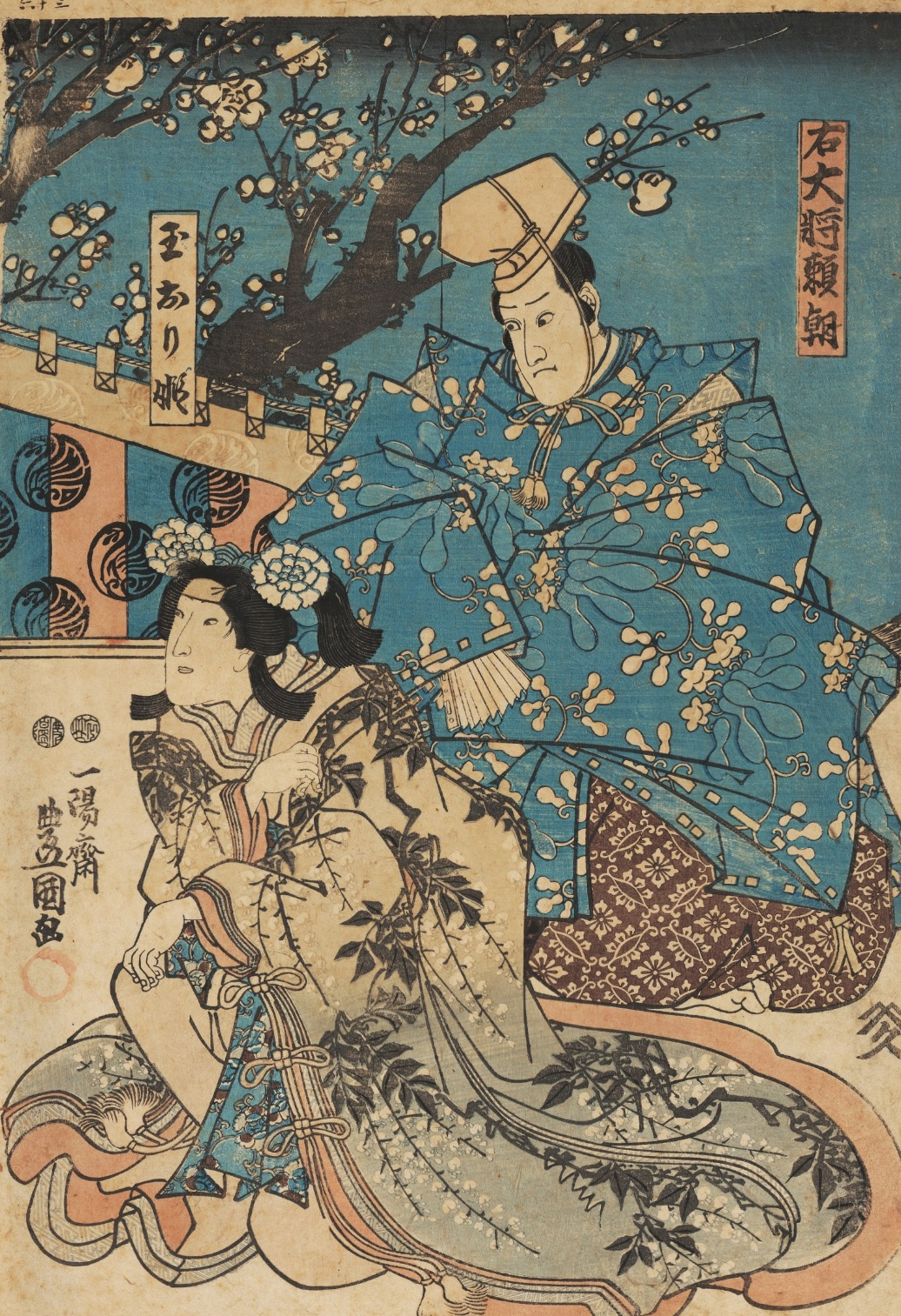
A couple (Yadahide ?), Japan, 19th century (Ukiyo-e).

=== Asian art ===
The collection of Asian art includes objects proceeding from many different cultures, from Near East to the Pacific Islands, including Turkey, Persia, India, China, Japan and Southeastern Asia. It comprises rugs, sculptures, paintings, prints, furniture and decorative and ritual items. Among these, Chinese artworks stand out, both in quality and quantity. The collection includes an important assemblage of ritual bronzes dating back to Shang (14th to 9th century BC) and Zhou dynasties (10th to 3rd century BC), ceramic funerary figures produced during the Tang dynasty (8th century) and polychromed wood sculptures of the Ming dynasty (14th to 17th century).

=== Brazilian art ===
The Colonial Brazilian art is represented by a group of 24 Baroque sacred images, as well as by a number of polychromed wood carvings (columns, doorways, finials etc.). Of particular importance are those made by Valentim da Fonseca e Silva (Master Valentim), proceeding from the demolished church of São Pedro dos Clérigos, in Rio de Janeiro. From modernist Brazilian artists, the collection includes important paintings by Lasar Segall, Candido Portinari, Emiliano Di Cavalcanti and Tarsila do Amaral, as well as sculptures by Victor Brecheret, Bruno Giorgi and Bella Prado. There are also drawings and prints by Clóvis Graciano, Iberê Camargo, Maria Bonomi, Marcelo Grassmann, Poty Lazzarotto, etc.

=== Classical antiquity ===
The collection of antiquities at the Ema Klabin Foundation consists of works in ceramic, terracotta, bronze and marble from Greek, Etruscan and Roman civilizations, most of which produced between the 4th century BC and the 1st century AD. It comprises sculptures, aryballos, amphorae, Tanagra figurines, etc. Outstanding among the sculptures is a Greek marble head of Zeus (5th century BC).

=== Decorative and applied arts ===
The collection of decorative and applied arts includes a relatively large number of pieces, such as light fixtures, rugs, small statuettes, fireplace pediments, mirrors and decorative objects in general. There is a large collection of tableware, including porcelain (Sèvres, Limoges, Meissen) and crystal glassware (Baccarat, Bohemia).

The furniture collection is mainly composed by Italian and French pieces, ranging from 16th to 19th century, including tables, cabinets and other items. The most important works in the collection, however, are those of Portuguese-Brazilian origin, produced with Jacaranda, being the most noticeable example a Portuguese games table desk with several ivory marquetry covers, commissioned by the Portuguese royalty. The collection also includes many examples of upholstery produced by Terry Della Stuffa, as well as Chinese tables and cabinets, etc.

The museum also holds an expressive silverware collection, composed by over 150 pieces. Outstanding among these are the assemblage of antique ceremonial chalices, proceeding from England, Germany and Russia, the collection of 19th-century Portuguese toothpick holders, the collection of English and Portuguese candlesticks, incense boats and chandeliers and the Brazilian religious silverware, which includes candlesticks, processional lanterns, etc. The collection of silver tableware is mainly composed by British pieces, executed by important silversmith sculptors, such as Paul de Lamerie, Paul Storr and John Wakelin.

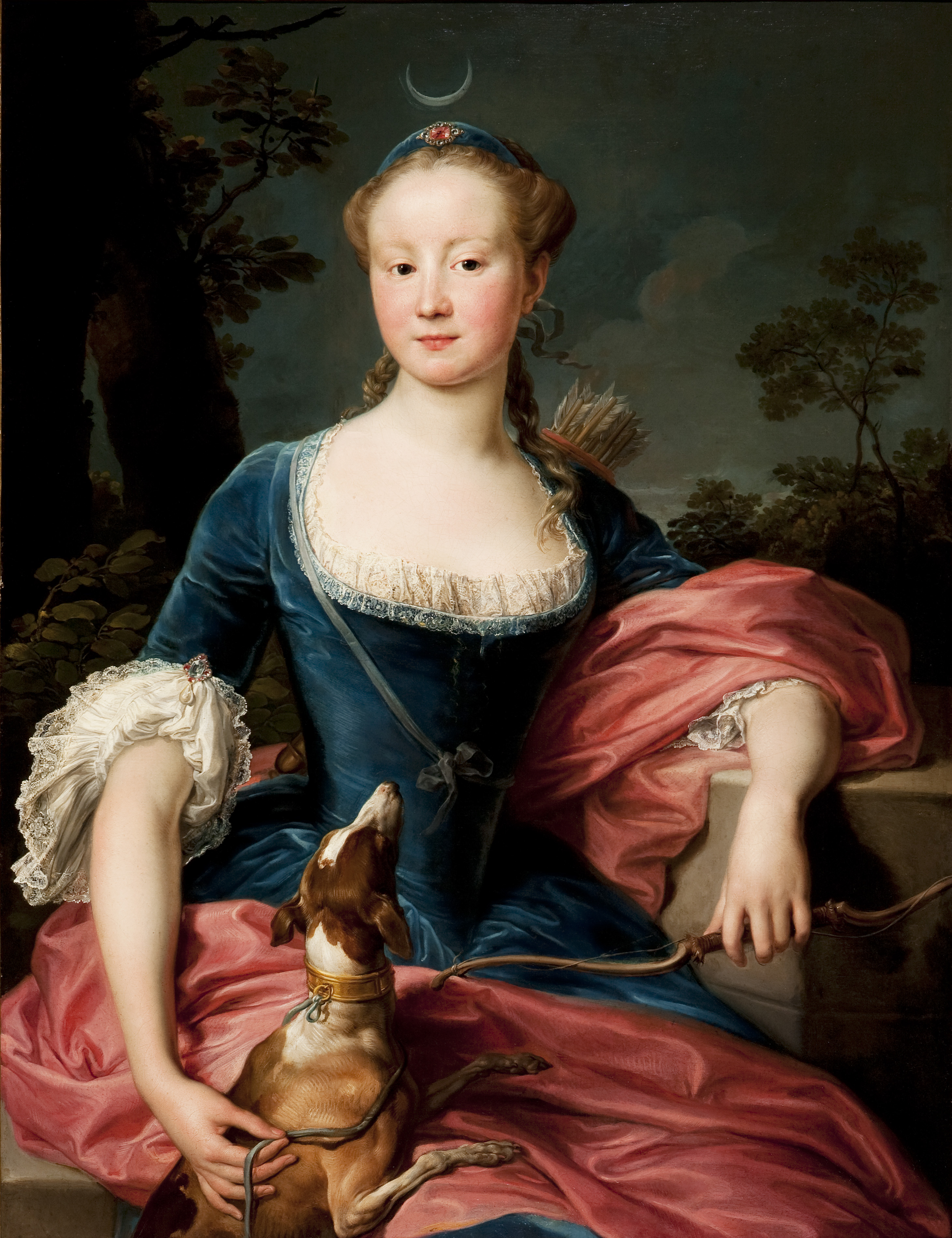
Pompeo Batoni. Portrait of a Lady as Diana the Huntress (1760s).

=== European art ===
The collection includes a number of Italian paintings dating from 16th to 18th century. Outstanding among them are the religious and mythological scenes by Raffaellino del Garbo, Giacomo Francia, Giovanni Battista Gaulli and Sebastiano Ricci, besides the portraits by Alessandro Allori and Pompeo Batoni.

The collection presents a wide panorama of Flemish and Dutch schools, ranging from 15th to 17th century, with a strong emphasis in Baroque paintings. It includes genre works, hunting scenes, landscapes, portraits and still lifes by artists as Jan Brueghel the Elder, Jan van Goyen, David Teniers the Younger, Gerard ter Borch, Abraham Brueghel, Philips Wouwerman and Abraham Hondius, beside two small panels attributed to Dirk Bouts. The collection also includes two landscape paintings by Frans Post, including View of Olinda, probably the most valuable canvas in the museum.

Outstanding among the French paintings is the canvas Ariadne by Jean-Baptiste Greuze. There are also landscapes and mythological scenes by Claude Lorrain, Gabriel Briard, Nicolas-Antoine Taunay, a Still-life by Pierre-Auguste Renoir and works by the painters of the School of Paris, like Chaïm Soutine and Maurice de Vlaminck, beside two important canvases by Marc Chagall: À la campagne and Couple with flowers and a rooster.

The European collection also include prints by Albrecht Dürer, Rembrandt, Francisco de Goya, Pablo Picasso, among others, as well as a number of Eastern icons.

=== Pre-Columbian art ===
This small collection is composed by objects produced prior to the 16th century, proceeding from relevant archaeological sites in present-day Bolivia, Peru and Mexico, such as Tiwanaku, Chancay and Nazca. It comprises works in terracotta, stone, wood and fabric produced by civilizations like Chavín, Moche, Chimú, Toltec, and Nazca.

== Library ==
The Ema Klabin Foundation Library holds a collection of more than 3,000 books. Though small in size, it includes an important set of rare works, such as illuminated manuscripts, incunabula and Aldine editions. It also holds a collection of reports of European travelers in Brazil, ranging from 16th to 19th century, including works by André Thévet, Arnoldus Montanus, Robert Southey, Willem Blaeu, Maria Graham, von Spix, von Martius, etc. Another highlight of the collection is the set of luxury books published by the Society of the One Hundred Bibliophiles of Brazil, illustrated by some of the most important Brazilian modernist artists.

== Gallery ==
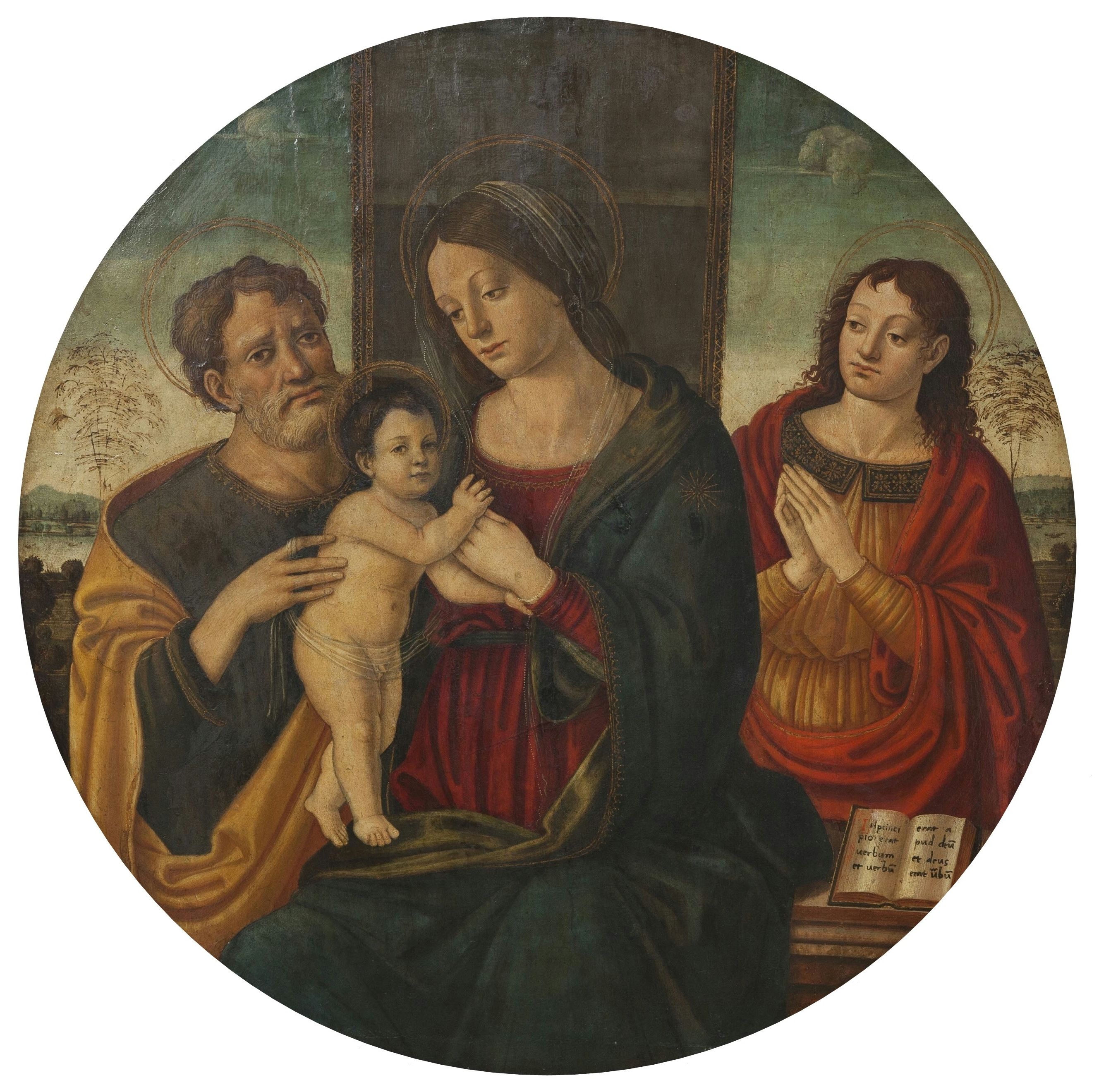
Raffaellino del Garbo (attribution) - Madonna and Child with St. Joseph and John the Baptist, 16th century.

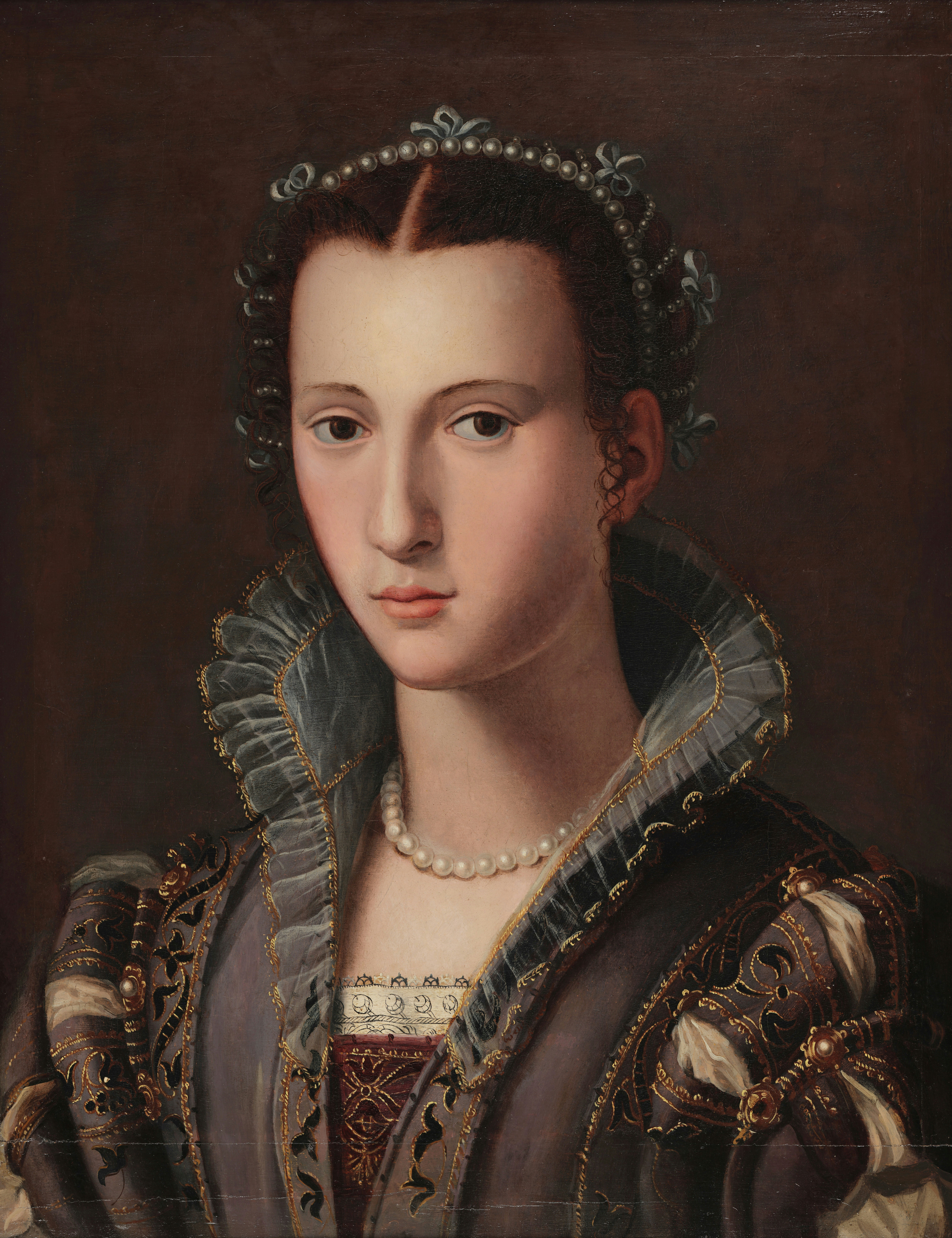
Alessandro Allori - Portrait of a Florentine Lady, 16th century.

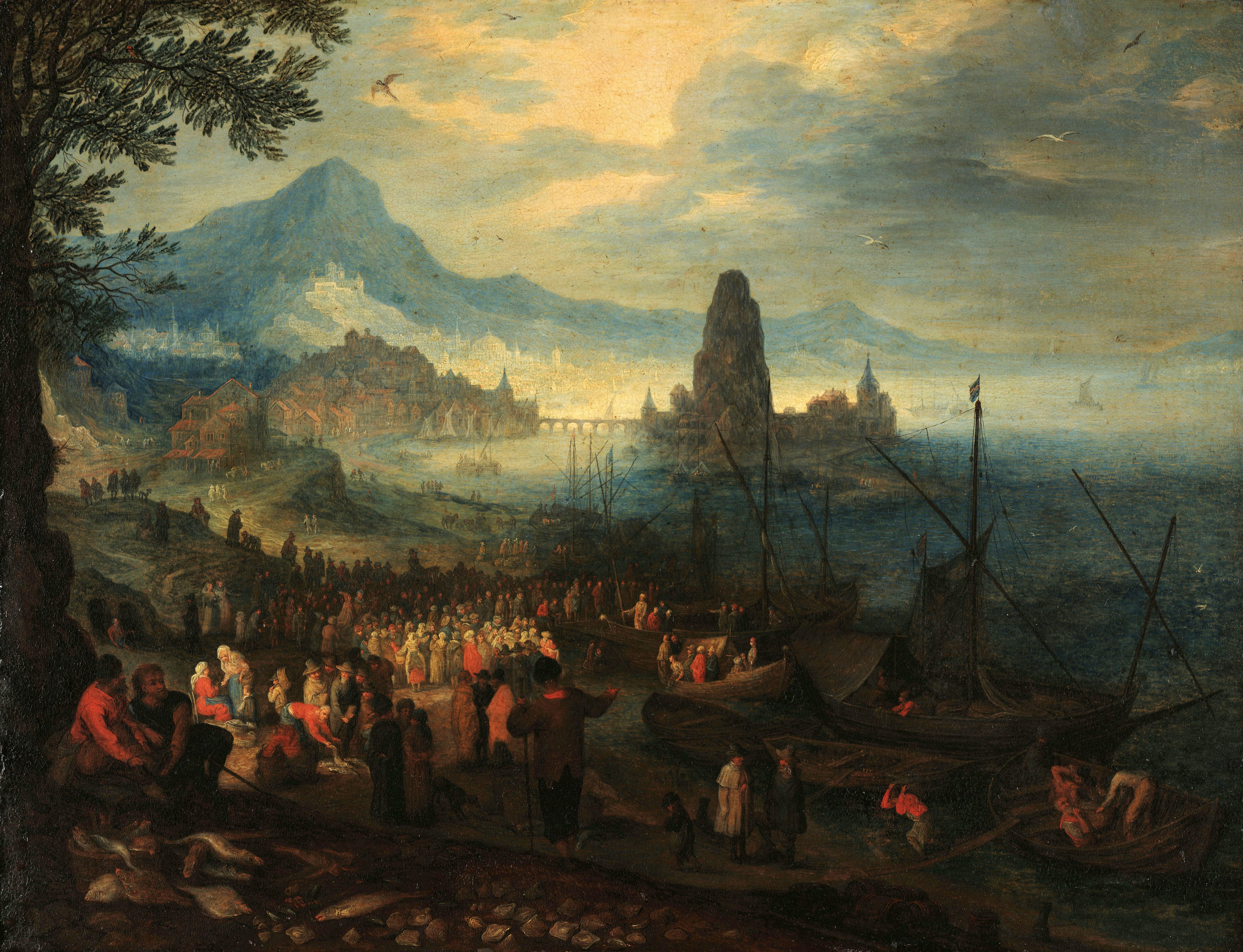
Jan Brueghel the Elder - Miraculous fishing, 1597.

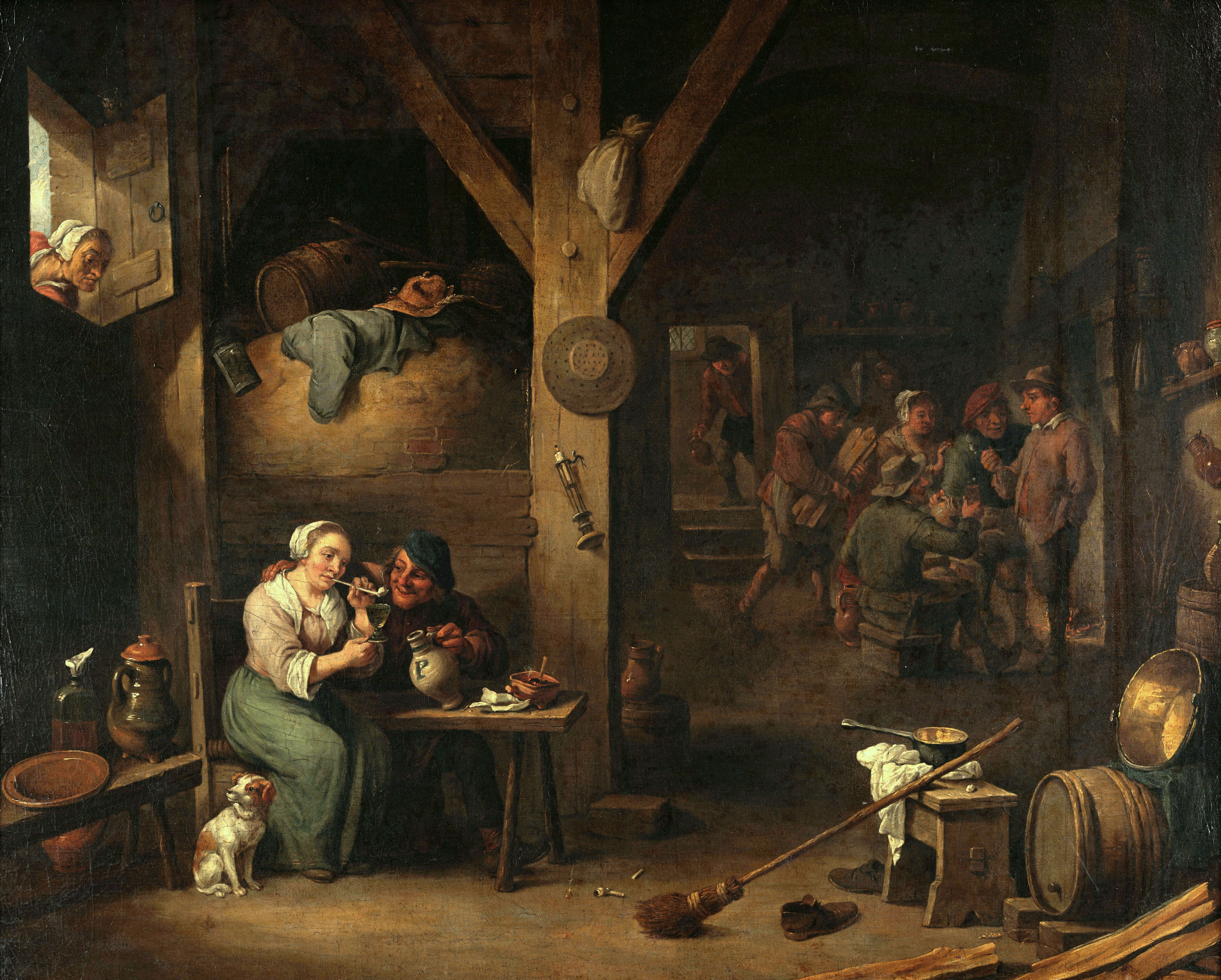
David Teniers the Younger - Tavern interior, 17th century.

Giovanni Battista Gaulli - Triumph of Bacchus and Ariadne, c. 1675.

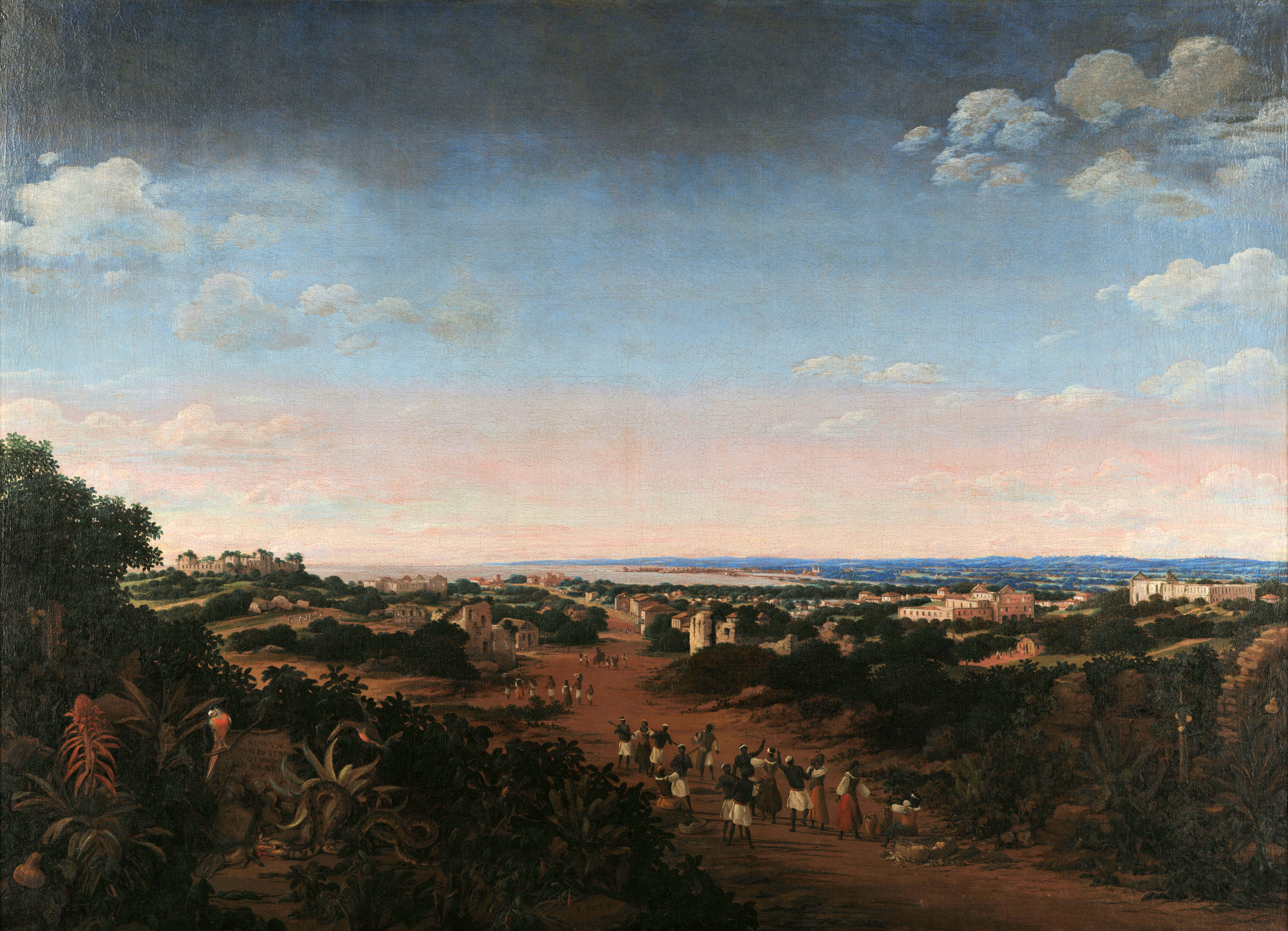
Frans Post - View of Olinda, c. 1650.

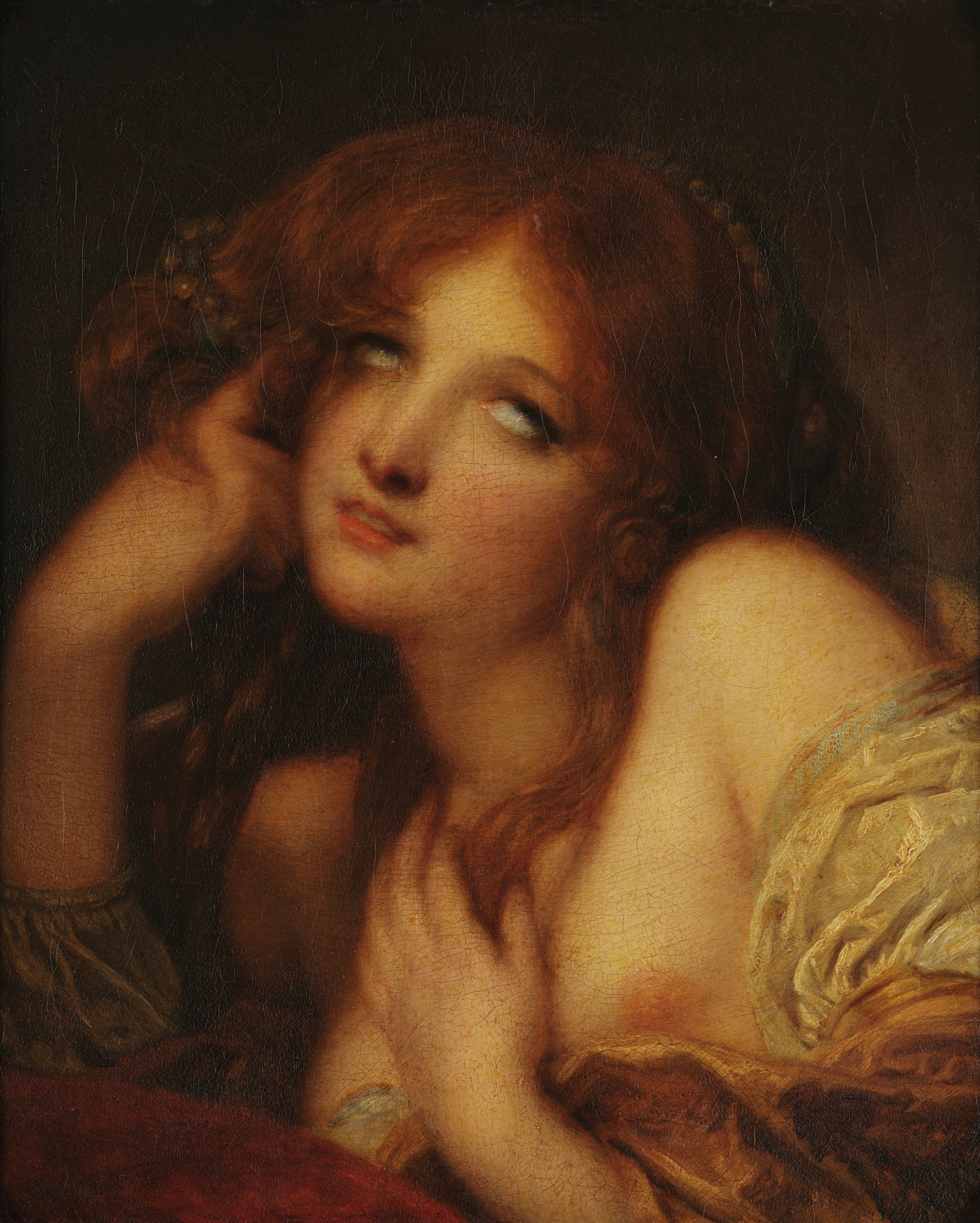
Jean-Baptiste Greuze - Ariadne, 18th century.

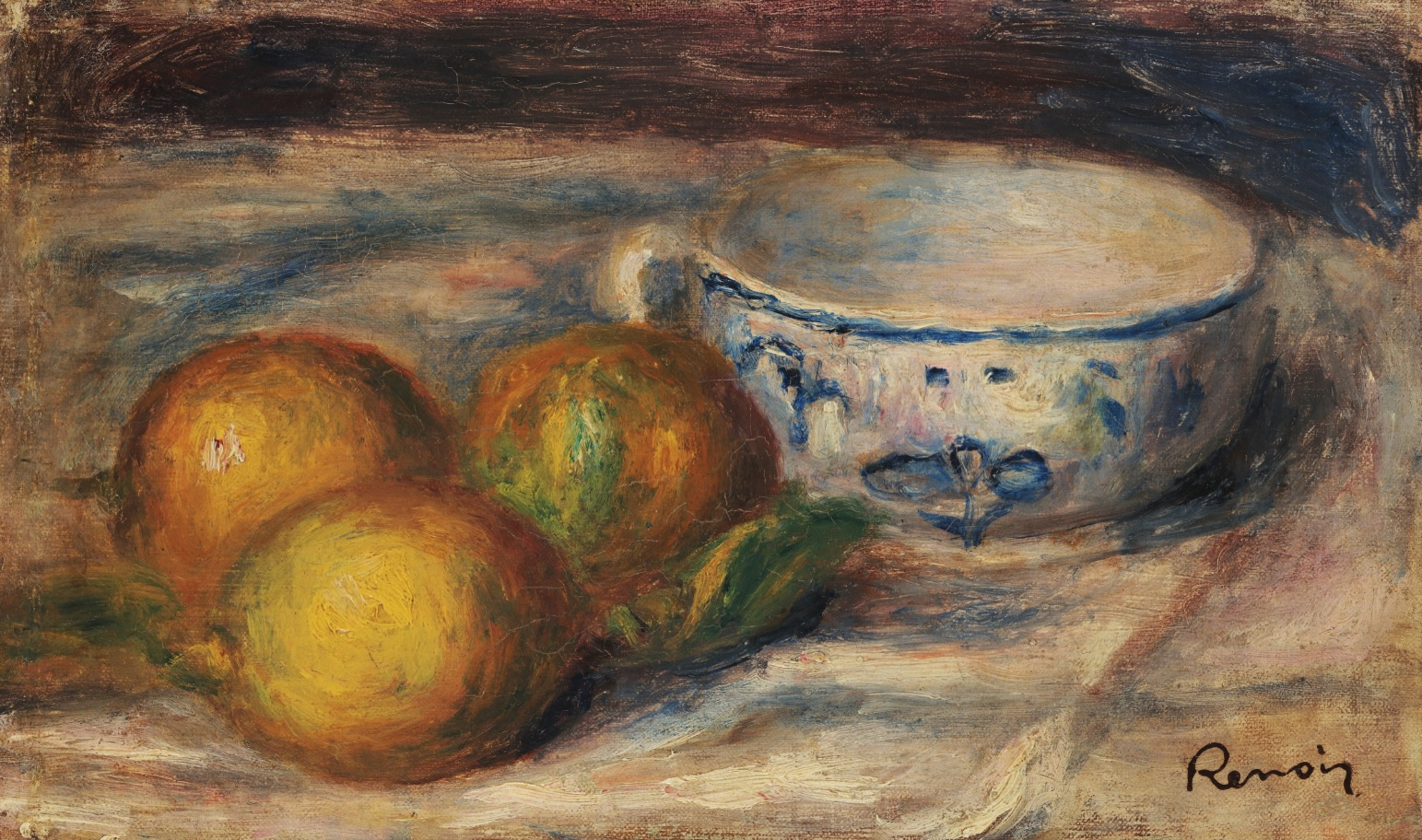
Pierre-Auguste Renoir - Still life, 1910.

== See also ==
- Klabin
- Eva Klabin Foundation
- São Paulo Museum of Art
- Pinacoteca do Estado de São Paulo
