= Eva Klabin House Museum =

Historic house museum in Rio de Janeiro, Brazil

Coordinates: 22.97551044°S 43.19834598°W

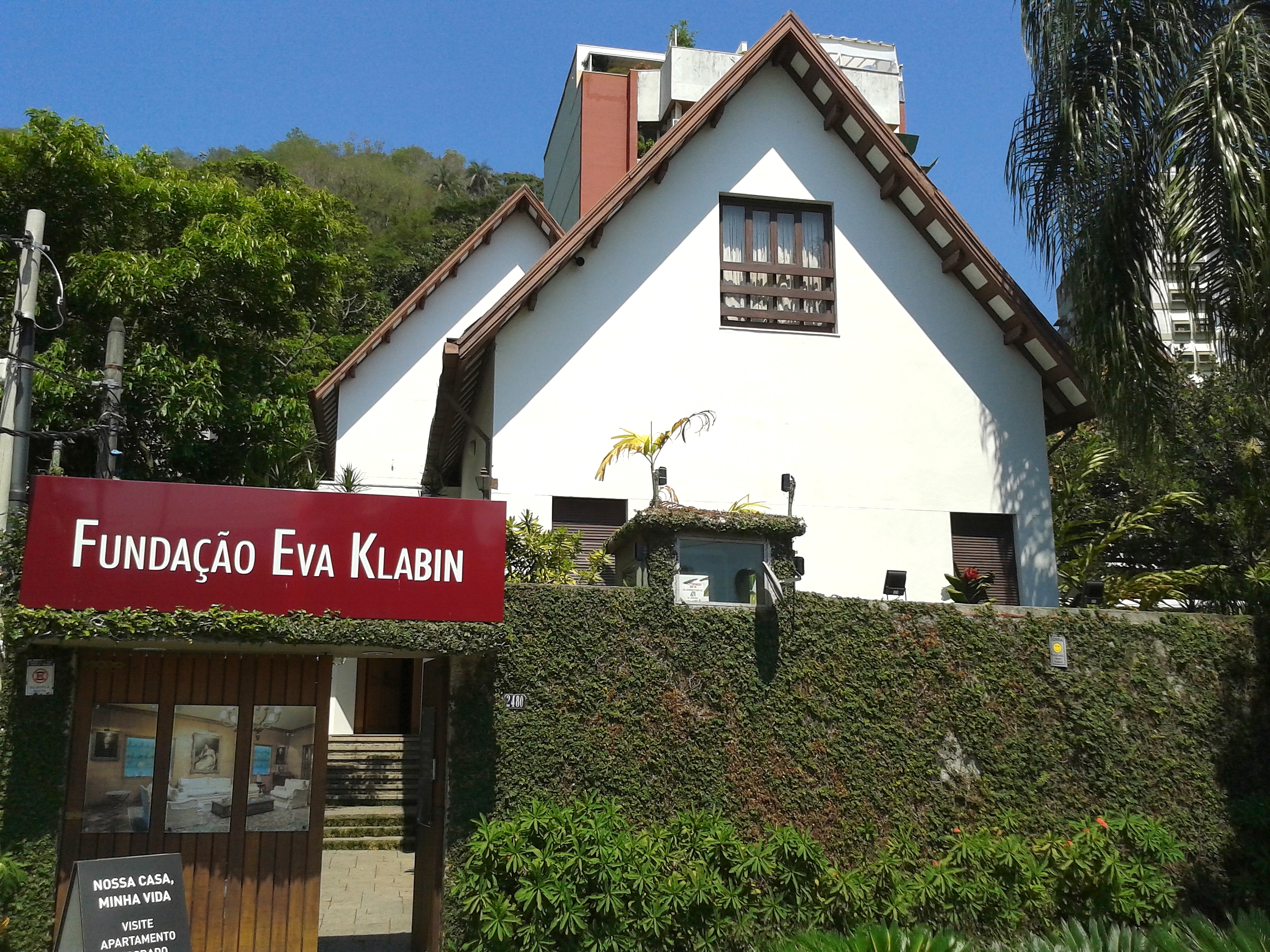
Eva Klabin Foundation.

The Eva Klabin House Museum (in Portuguese, Casa Museu Eva Klabin) is an historic house museum located in the city of Rio de Janeiro, Brazil. It is a private institution established in 1990 by the Brazilian collector and philanthropist Eva Klabin (1903–1991), with the purpose of preserving and displaying the art collection gathered together during her life. The collection is open to the public in the house where Klabin lived for over thirty years. It is considered one of the largest classical art collections in Brazilian museums, with over 2000 works spanning almost 5000 years, from Ancient Egypt to Impressionism.

== Eva Klabin ==
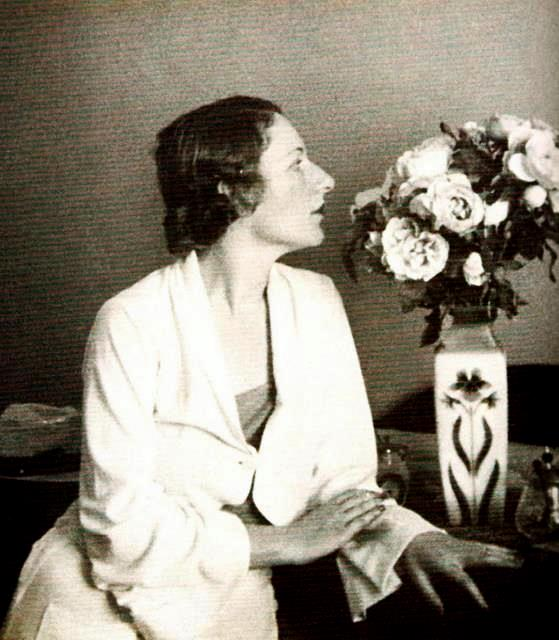
Eva Klabin in 1929.

Eva Klabin, born in São Paulo in 1903, was the eldest daughter of the Lithuanian immigrants Fanny and Hessel Klabin. Her father was one of the founders of Klabin, one of the leading paper industries of the country. In her teenage years, she lived in Germany with her family. After the World War I erupted, they were forced to move to Switzerland, where Eva attended a school in Neuchâtel. The family returned to Brazil in 1919, but Eva went back to Germany in 1922, escorting her mother, who underwent treatments for her health. Three years after her mother's death in 1926, Eva embarked to the United States to complete her studies. There, she attended the New York School of Secretaries and did voice over for a Paramount movie called Anybody's Woman.

After returning to São Paulo, she married, in 1933, the Austrian-born Brazilian lawyer and journalist Paulo Rapaport and moved with him to Rio de Janeiro. In 1952, they bought the house where both would live for the rest of their lives, one of the first houses built around the newly urbanized Rodrigo de Freitas Lagoon. There, Eva started collecting artworks, sometimes relying on her husband support to acquire some objects. After Paulo's death in 1957, Eva wouldn't marry again. Childless, she devoted herself almost exclusively to the habit of collecting, making frequent travels to Europe to acquire new items.

In the 1960s, with the growing of the collection, Eva decided to renovate and expand her house, while maintaining its original style. She would later become a prominent figure of Brazilian cultural and political life, as also a leading hostess in Rio de Janeiro, offering gala dinners to important guests, such as Harry Oppenheimer, Juscelino Kubitschek, David Rockefeller, Elie Wiesel, Henry Kissinger and Shimon Peres. After the fire which destroyed 70% of the collection of the Rio de Janeiro Museum of Modern Art in 1978, shocking the Brazilian artistic community, Eva started worrying about the future of her collection. She decided to hire experts to draw up an inventory of her holdings and conduct researches on individual itens. Following the steps of her sister, Ema Gordon Klabin, who had established the Ema Gordon Klabin Cultural Foundation in the same year that the fire happened, Eva started taking the legal measures required to establish her own foundation. Eva died in 1991, one year after the foundation was established.

== Foundation ==
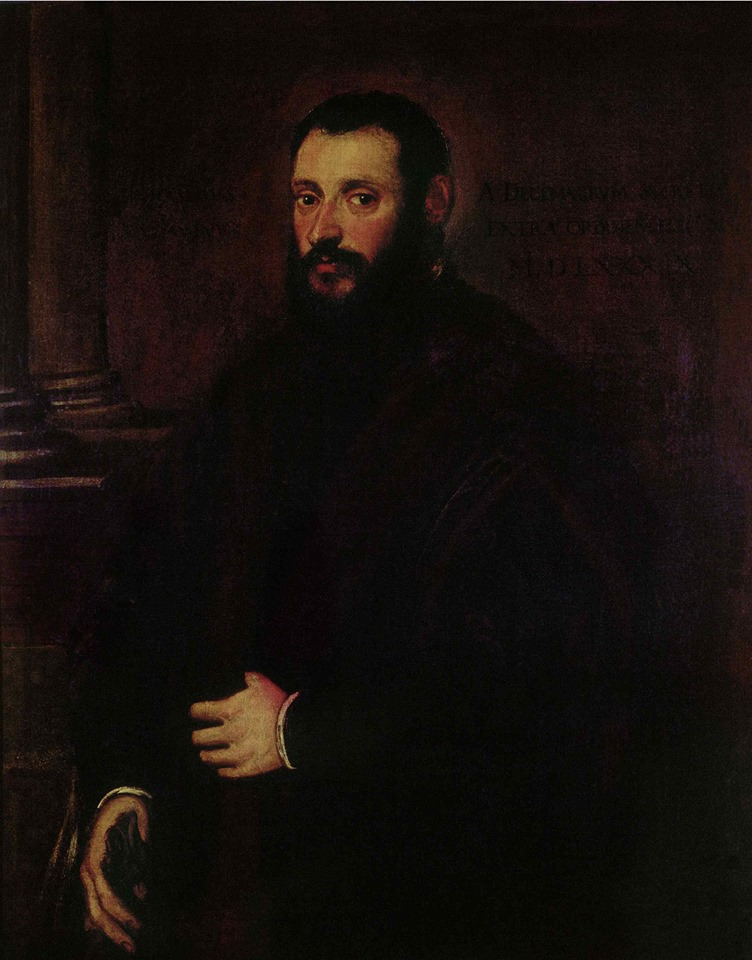
Jacopo Tintoretto - Portrait of Nicolaus Padavinus (1589).

Idealized in the 1970s and legally in established in 1990, the Eva Klabin Foundation was officially open for public visitation by Francisco Weffort, Brazil's Minister of Culture at that time, on August 22, 1995. Besides preserving and displaying the collection, the foundation has also the mission of organizing cultural, artistic, historical and scientific activities, such as temporary exhibitions, concerts, courses and conferences. It also has an editorial department devoted to publishing works on the collection. The institution falls into the typology of "house-museum", where artworks are permanently arranged throughout the rooms according to Eva's wish and taste.

The Breathing Project was created in 2004 by Marcio Doctors, who has curated it ever since. Its aim is to foster interaction between contemporary art interventions and the classical art collection at Fundação Eva Klabin. Doctors invites contemporary artists to intervene in the exhibition spaces at the house museum, creating a bridge between the established art from the past and contemporary manifestations. Ernesto Neto, Nuno Ramos, Anna Bella Geiger, Claudia Bakker and José Damasceno are just a few of the guest artists.

=== House ===
The house is located on the banks of the Rodrigo de Freitas Lagoon, in the South Zone of Rio de Janeiro. It was built in 1931, in Norman style, which was very much in fashion at the time. In 1952, the Roman architect Gaetano Minnucci was commissioned by Eva and her husband to renovate the house, which gained palatial facades and interiors in classic spirit. The house was expanded in the 1960s to accommodate the growing collection. The items are arranged throughout nine main rooms, which were named by Eva: Main Hall, Renaissance Room, English Room, Dining Room, Chinese Room, Upper Hall, Green Room, Boudoir and Bedroom.

The yard was projected by Brazilian landscape architect Roberto Burle Marx.

== The collection ==
The Eva Klabin Foundation collection is one of the most important classic art collections in Brazilian museums. It comprises over 2000 itens from Europe, Asia, Africa and the Americas, spanning a time-frame of almost 5000 years. The collection features paintings, sculptures, antiquities, furniture, oriental rugs, silverware and decorative objets d’art.

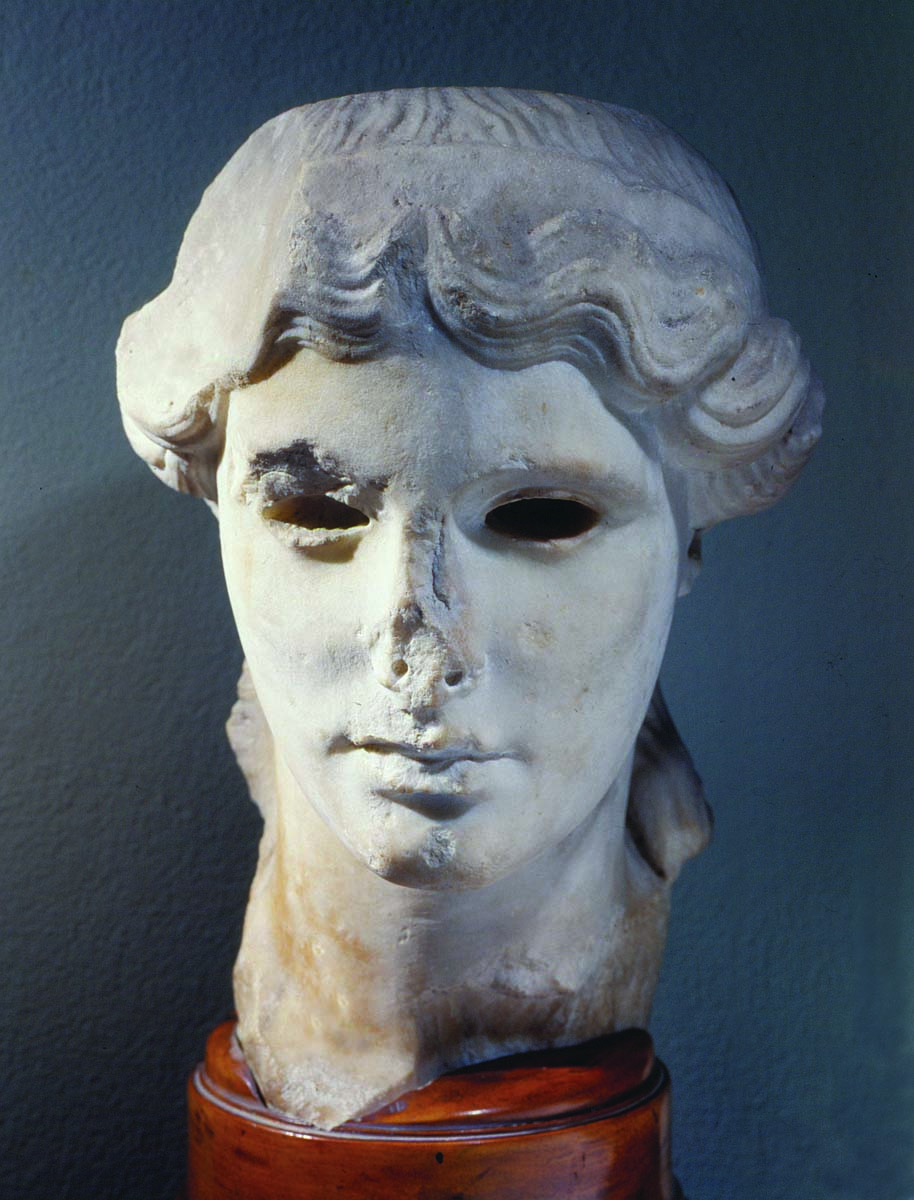
Head of Apollo in marble, between 201 and 1 BC.

=== Greco-Roman collection ===
Among the highlights of the Greco-Roman collection is a marble head of Apollo, fragment of a larger statue coming from Magna Graecia and dating back to 3rd-1st century BC, and a woman's torso in pentelic marble, from the classic Athenian period. The collection also includes an important group of 24 Tanagras (terracotta figurines) dating back to the 4th century BC, and an assemblage of 58 ancient glass flasks and small vases provenient from the Mediterranean Basin, under the rule of the Roman Empire. It also comprises red and black pottery vases, an Attic krater from the Classic Period and two Italiote vases from Apulia and Magna Graecia.

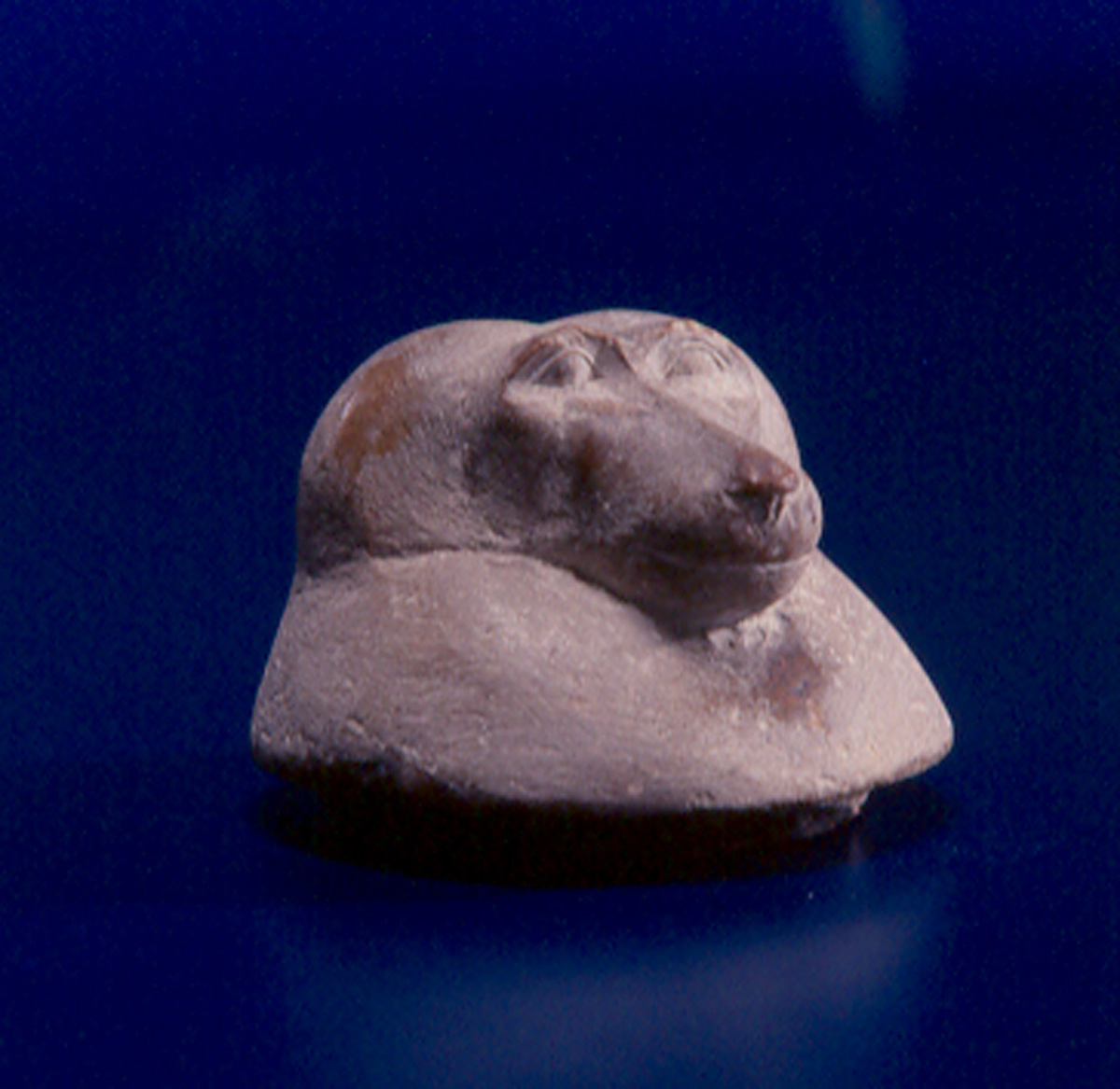
Canopic cap with Hapy head, between 664 and 525 b.C.

=== Egyptian collection ===
The Egyptian collection consists of about fifty items, including some objects which stand out in the context of Brazilian museums, due to their quality and rarity. Since these objects are not related to official archeological excavations, their exact place of origin remains largely unknown. The collection includes a number of large pharaonic statuary, in which a head of a Pharaoh in a nemes headdress is the centerpiece. Among the funerary itens, there is a coffin mask with encrusted glass eyes dating back to the 17th Dynasty, and other pieces which reflect the importance of animals in Egyptian rituals, such as a coffin of a mummified cat from the Ptolemaic period. The collection also includes reliefs and fragments of architectural decoration, such as a prominent temple bas-relief of a goddess with the body of a woman and the head of a lioness, dating back to the 3rd Intermediate Period.

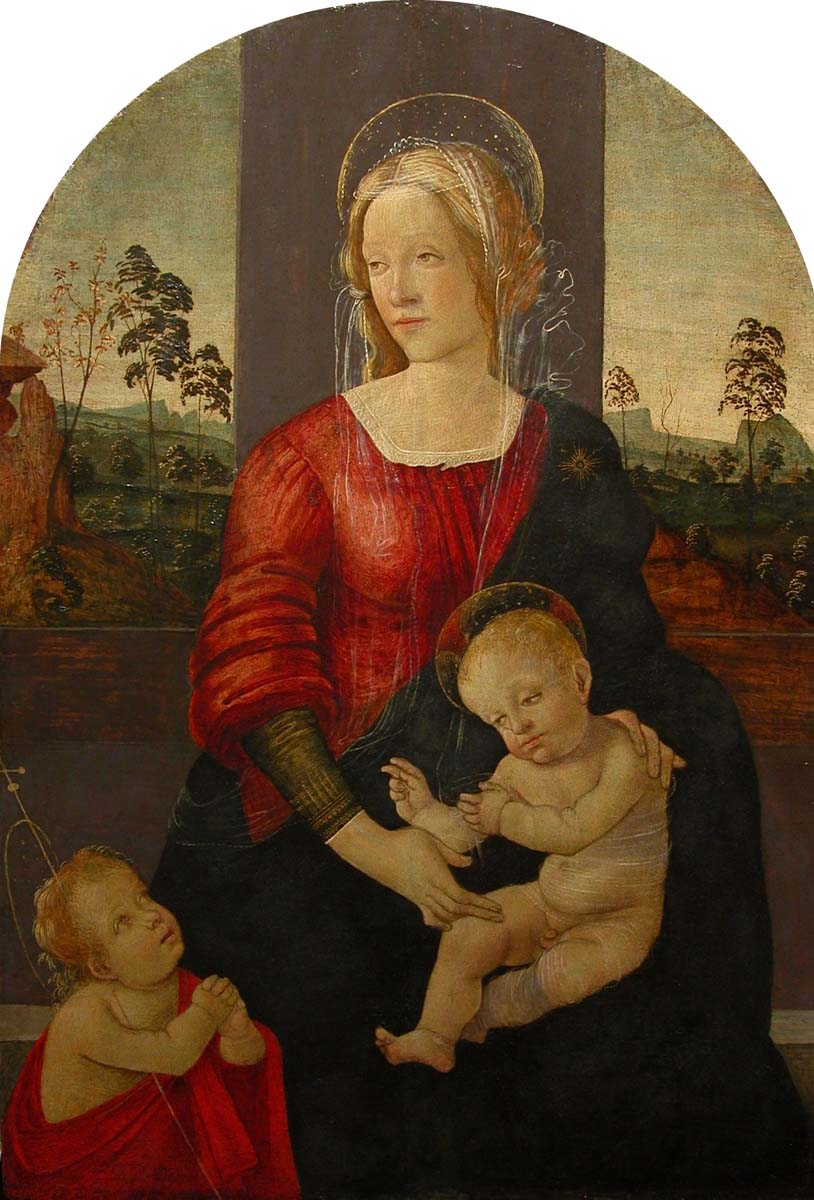
Sandro Botticelli (atribuition) - Madonna with Child and St. John the Baptist, 15th century.

=== Italian collection ===
The Italian collection is noted for its emphasis in the Renaissance art. Outstanding among the paintings are the panels by Piermatteo Lauro de' Manfredi da Amelia and Sano di Pietro. There are several examples of Madonnas by Sienese, Florentine and Lombardian schools, including works attributed to Sandro Botticelli, Andrea del Sarto and Antoniazzo Romano. The large Portrait of Nicolaus Padavinus by Jacopo Tintoretto is the most important canvas in the collection. There are also works by Bernardo Strozzi, Guercino and Giovanni Francesco Romanelli, epitomizing the Baroque.

The Florentine school outstands among the sculptures: a Madonna by Benedetto da Maiano, with a glazed ceramic frame by Andrea della Robbia, a pair of angels by Luca della Robbia, Madonna with Swaddled Child by Donatello, another Madonna by the workshop of Lorenzo Ghiberti are the main highlights, along with Mars, a bronze sculpture attributed to Giambologna. The collection also includes decorative objects, majolica plates and several examples of Renaissance furniture.

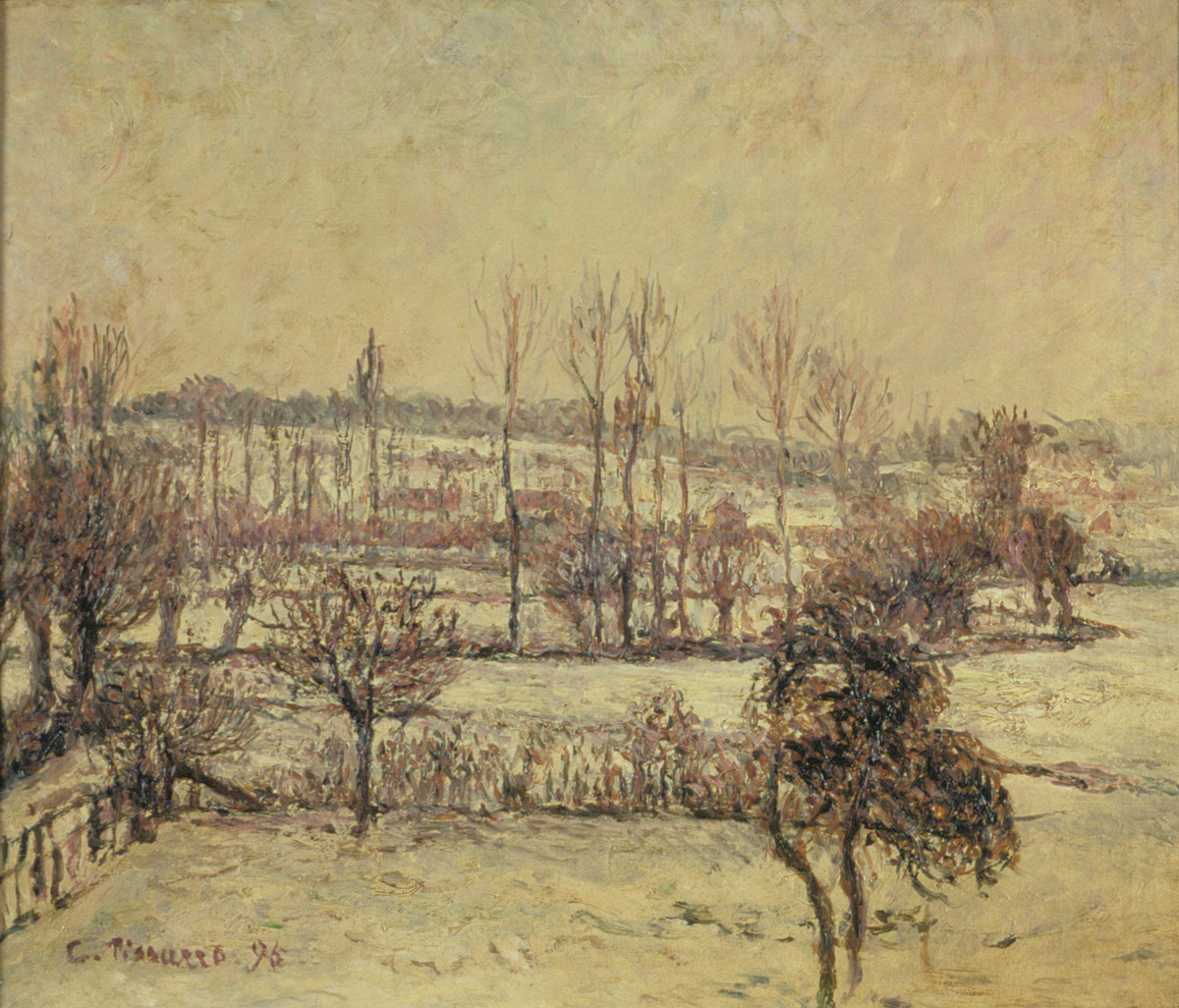
Camille Pissarro - Snow effect in Eragny, 1895.

=== French collection ===
The French collection is composed by paintings, sculptures, drawings and decorative objects ranging from Middle Ages to the beginning of the 20th century. Outstanding among the paintings are a portrait attributed to François Clouet, a mythological scene by Louis Silvestre, two small landscapes by Nicolas-Antoine Taunay, a winter landscape by Camille Pissarro and head of a woman by Marie Laurencin. From the Rococo style, there's a drawing by Honoré Fragonard, entitled Le Petit Gourmand.

Among the sculptures, the museum holds a very nice example of medieval stone statuary, Head a Noblewoman. The Renaissance French statuary is represented by a number of wooden carvings by anonymous masters. Two small terracotta fauns attributed to Clodion represents the Rococo trend. The collection of decorative arts includes late Gothic furniture, an assemblage of enameled Limoges plaques by Léonard Limosin, porcelain objets, Sèvres and Limoges dinner sets, Baccarat crystal, etc.

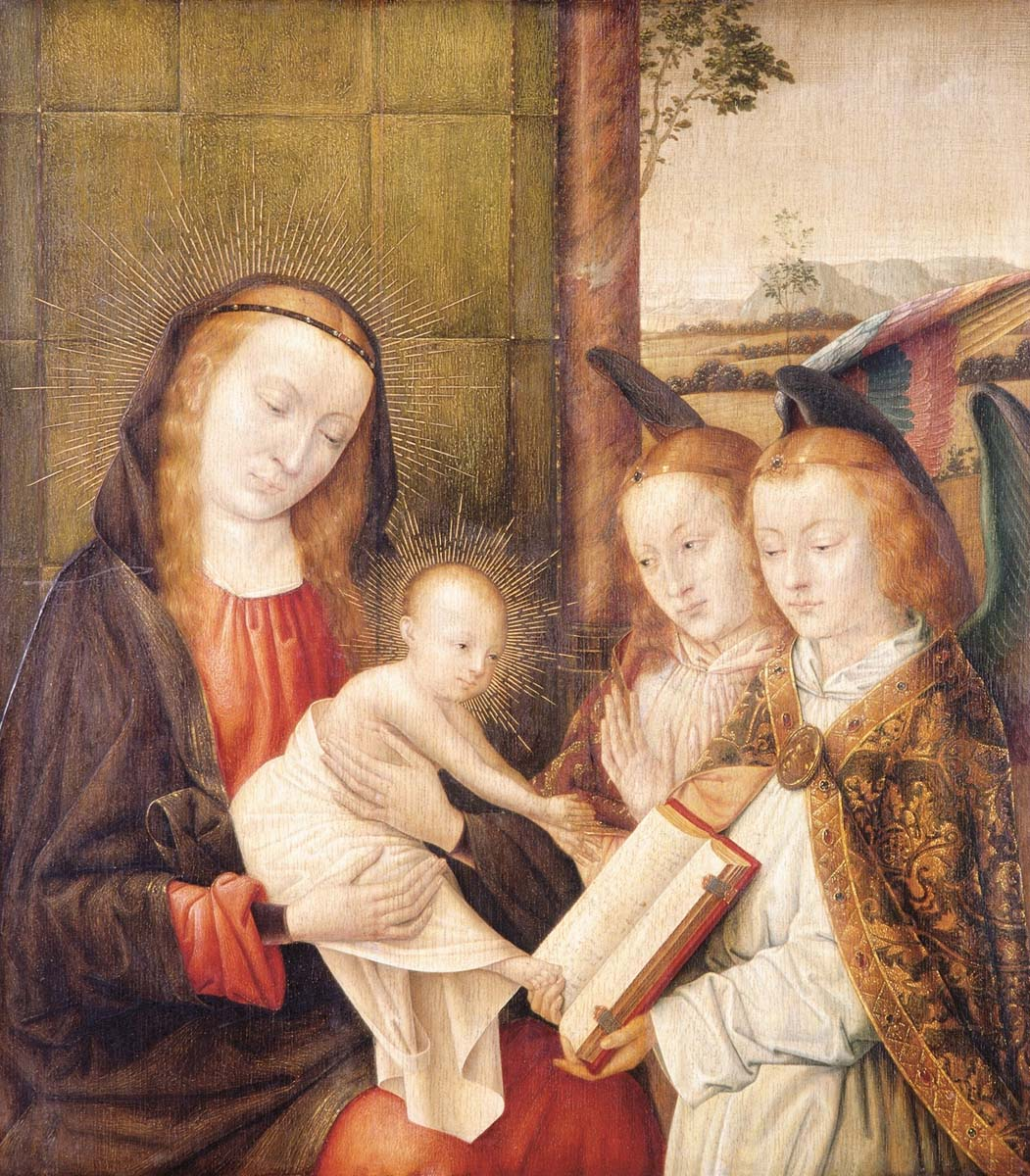
Jan Provoost - Madonna with Child and Two Angels", 16th century.

=== Flemish and Dutch collection ===
The museum holds a small group of Early Netherlandish paintings, including works by Adriaen Isenbrandt (Madonna and Child in a landscape), Jan Provost (Madonna and Child with two angels) and a Madonna attributed to Mabuse. Most part of the paintings in the collection, however, are by 17th-century Flemish and Dutch masters. The Dutch School is represented by landscapes, portraits and still lifes by artists as Govaert Flinck, Gerard ter Borch, Hercules Seghers, Philips Wouwerman, Pieter Steenwyck and Guillaume Dubois, besides miniatures by Jan Glauber and prints by Rembrandt. The Flemish school is represented by landscapes of Hermann Naiwinx and Jodocus de Momper and a mythological scene by Hendrick van Balen.

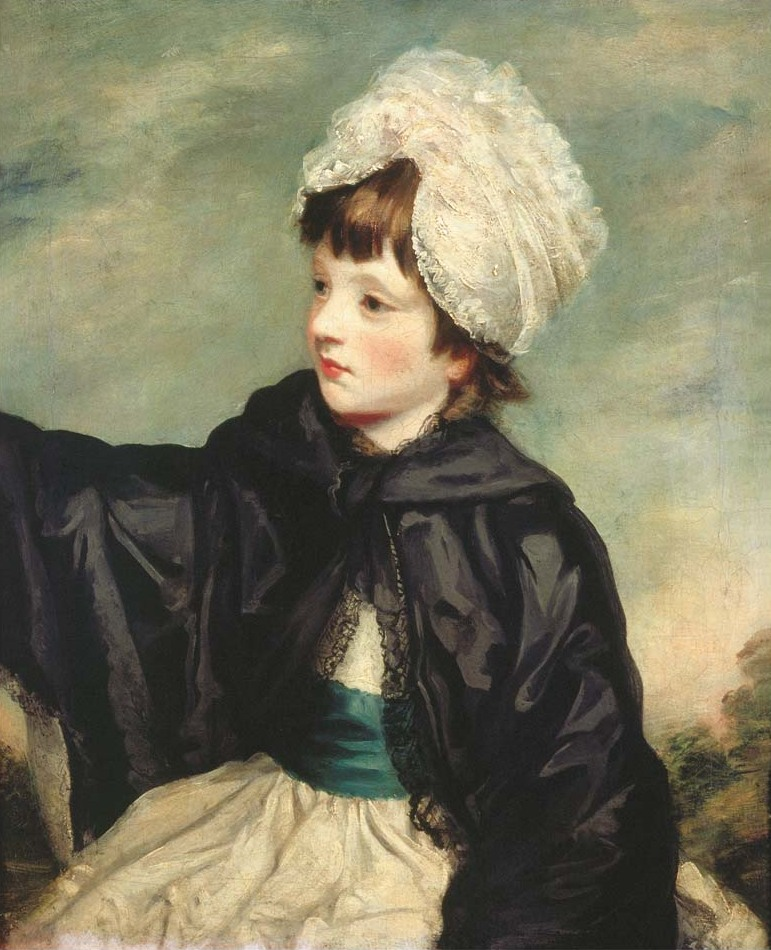
Joshua Reynolds - Study for a portrait of Lady Caroline, 18th century.

=== English collection ===
Aside from the Portrait of Lady Jane Grey, painted in Mannerist style and dated 1553, the English painting collection consists of 18th century portraits. One of the highlights of is the study for the Portrait of Lady Caroline by Joshua Reynolds, whose final version is displayed at the National Gallery of Art in Washington. Also important is the Portrait of Mrs. Williams as Saint Cecilia by Thomas Lawrence. The collection also includes Portrait of a Man and a Landscape by Thomas Gainsborough, Portrait of Mr. Hylar by Lemuel Francis Abbott, Portrait of Mr. Critchley by George Romney and Portrait of a Young Lady by John Hoppner.

The decorative arts segment includes an important assemblage of silverware dating back to the 17th, 18th and 19th centuries, bearing hallmarks of the leading silversmiths of each period, as well as a number of 17th and 18th furniture items.

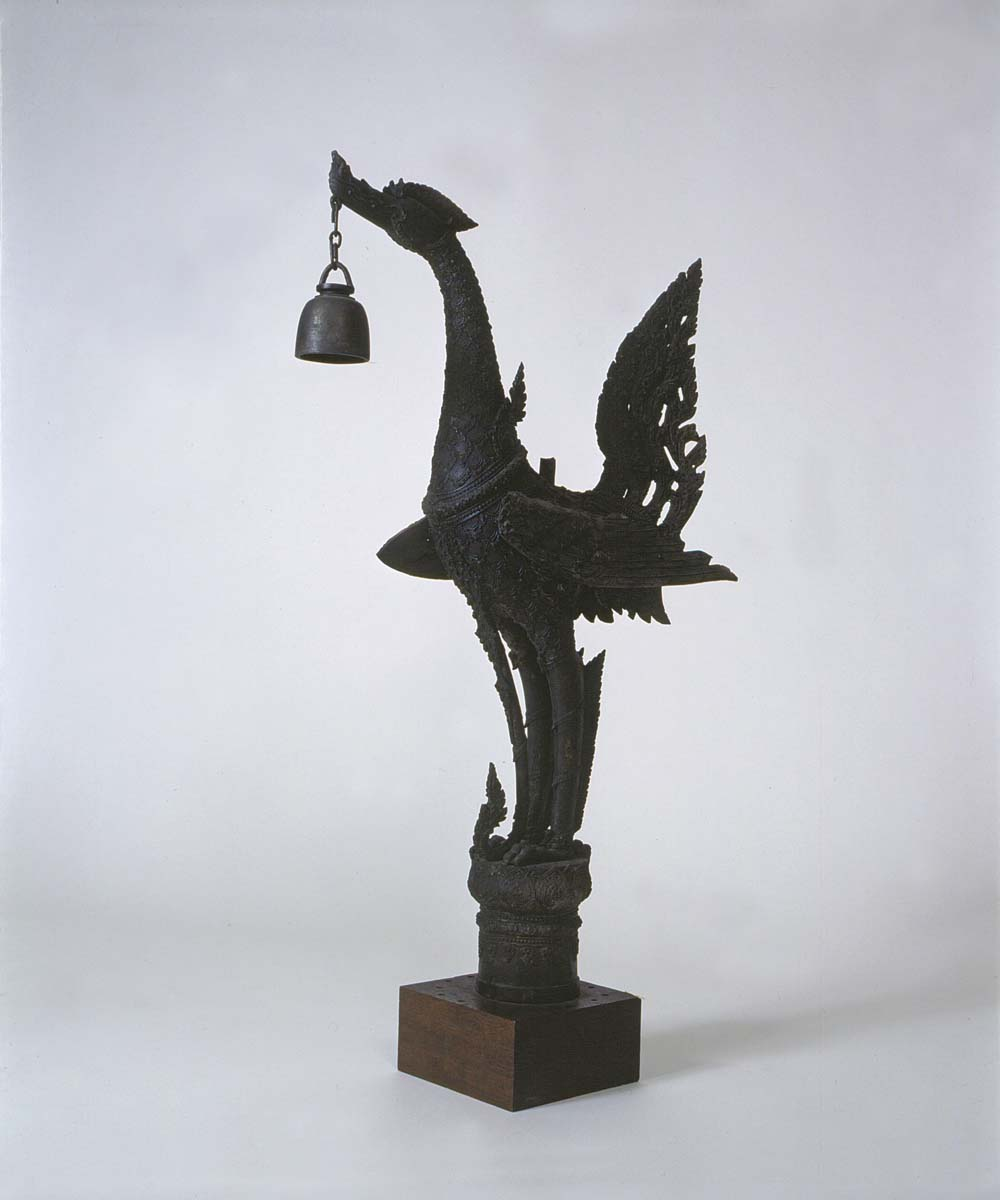
Crane with a bell in its beak, 19th century

=== Oriental collection ===
The oriental collection includes objects from China, Burma, Cambodia, India, Indonesia, Japan, Thailand and Tibet, ranging from the Bronze Age through to the 20th century. The Chinese segment is the most strongly represented. It includes libation chalices and a Kuei ritual vase, dating back to the Shang dynasty, as well as bronze ritual vases, bells and a mirror of the Zhou dynasty. The terracota itens produced during the Tang dynasty are particularly notable: statuettes representing animals, Court ladies, dignitaries, flute-players, etc. The collection also includes wooden sculptures of Buddhist divinities, like the Bodhisattvas, dating back to the Ming dynasty. Two large scale statues outstand in the collection: a wooden figure of Guan Yin (Song dynasty) and a metal Worshiping Buddha, produced in Thailand in the early 19th century. Among the other objects, there are pottery vases from the Qing dynasty, scrolls of painted silk on rice-paper, pottery, ceramics, porcelain and lacquer, statuettes of Indian deities, etc.

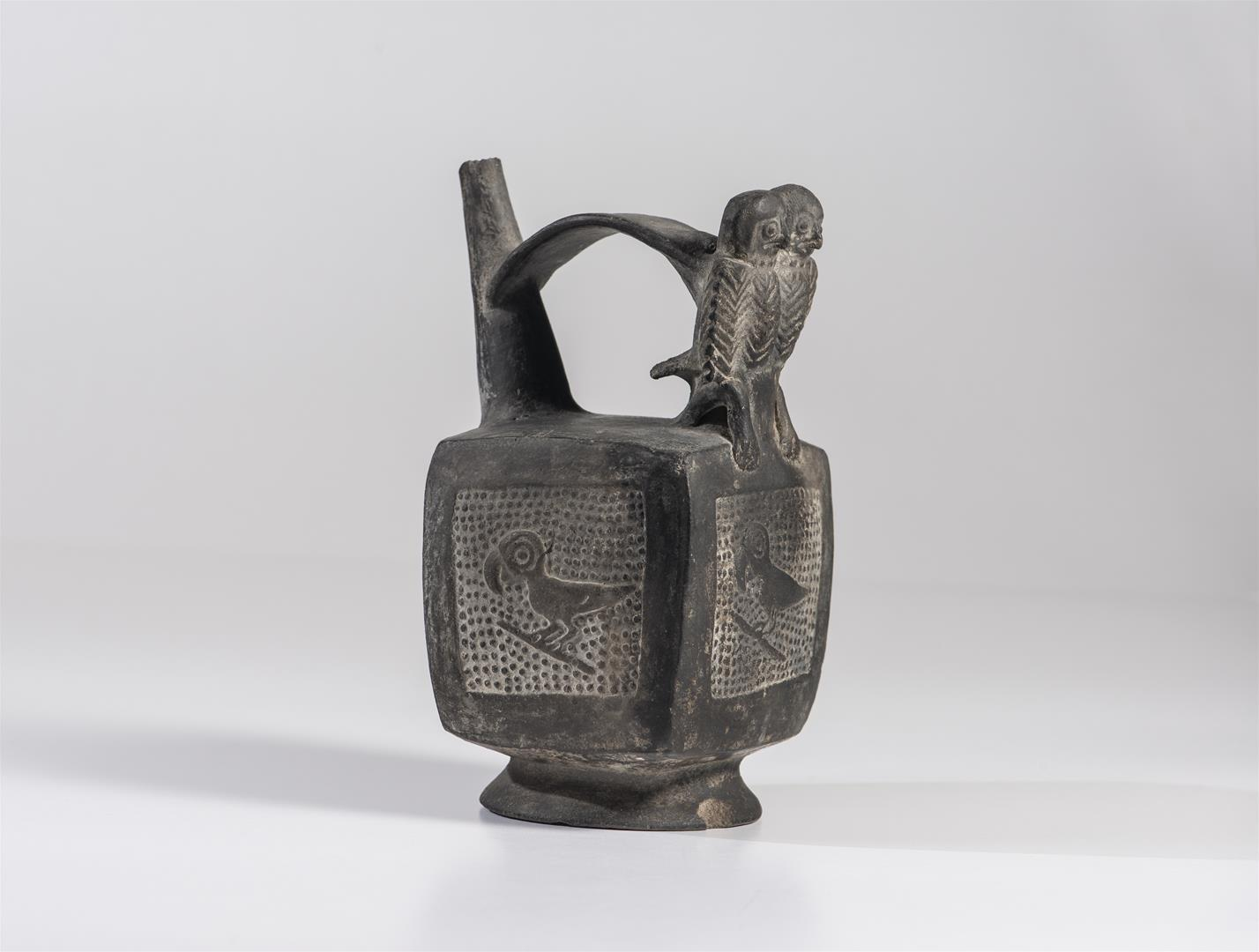
Whistling vase, between 1200 and 1450

=== Pre-Columbian collection ===
The Pre-Columbian art|Pre-Columbian collection is mainly composed by objects produced by civilizations living in present-day Peru, mainly the Nazca and the Chimú. From Nazca, it conserves anthropomorphic polychrome pottery vases decorated with fantastic animals, as well as fragments of wool and cotton fabric. From Chimu, it includes modeled pottery, such as water-canteens, twinned bottles and whistling vases.

The collection also holds vases from the Yanpara (1470–1538), Lambayeque, and Tiwanaku (1000–1200) civilizations of present-day Bolivia, as well as four Mexican statuettes representing warriors and human figures of unidentified origin. Quero-type wooden vases, a small bone scale, and fragments of cotton and woolen fabrics complete the collection.

== Gallery ==
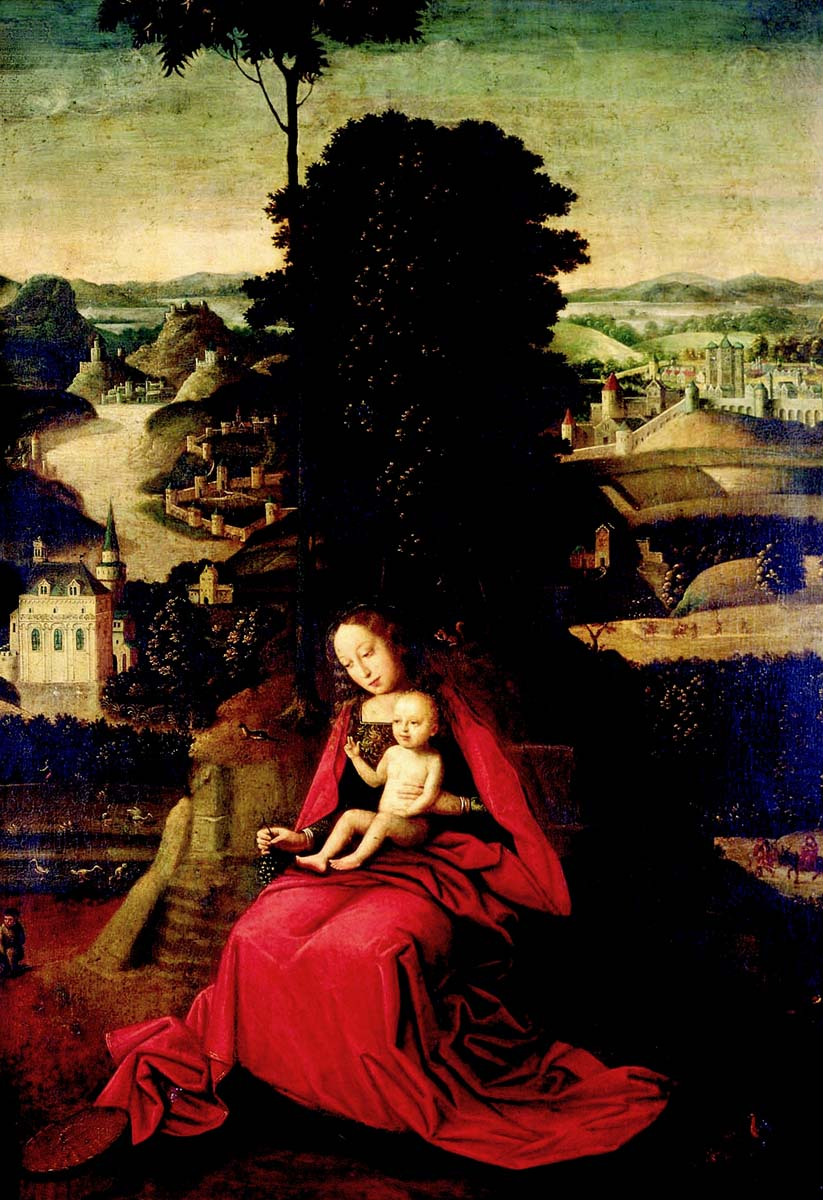
Adriaen Isenbrandt - Madonna and Child in a landscape, 16th century.

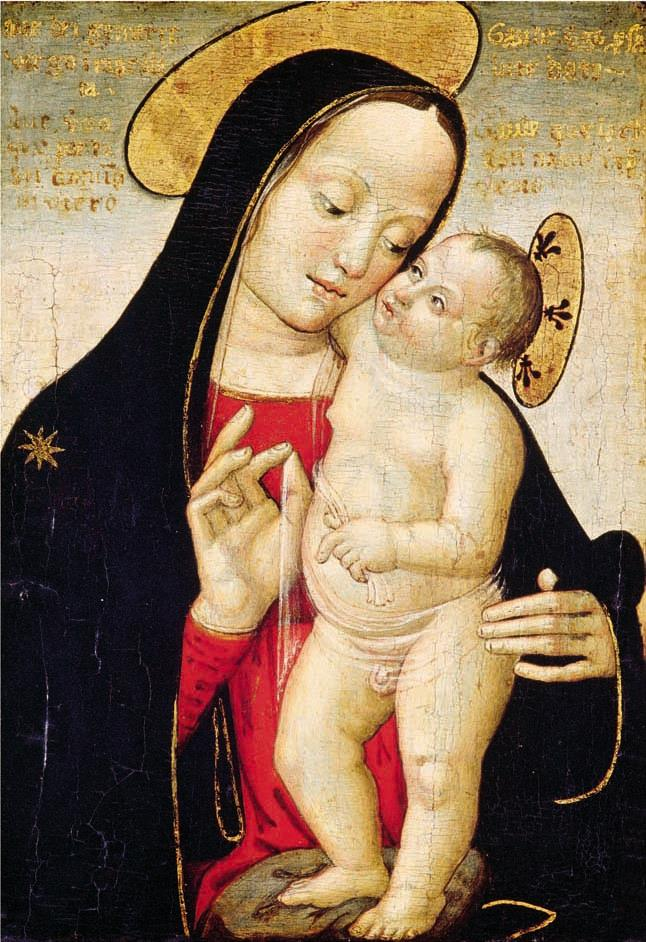
Antoniazzo Romano (attribution) - Madonna and Child, 15th century.

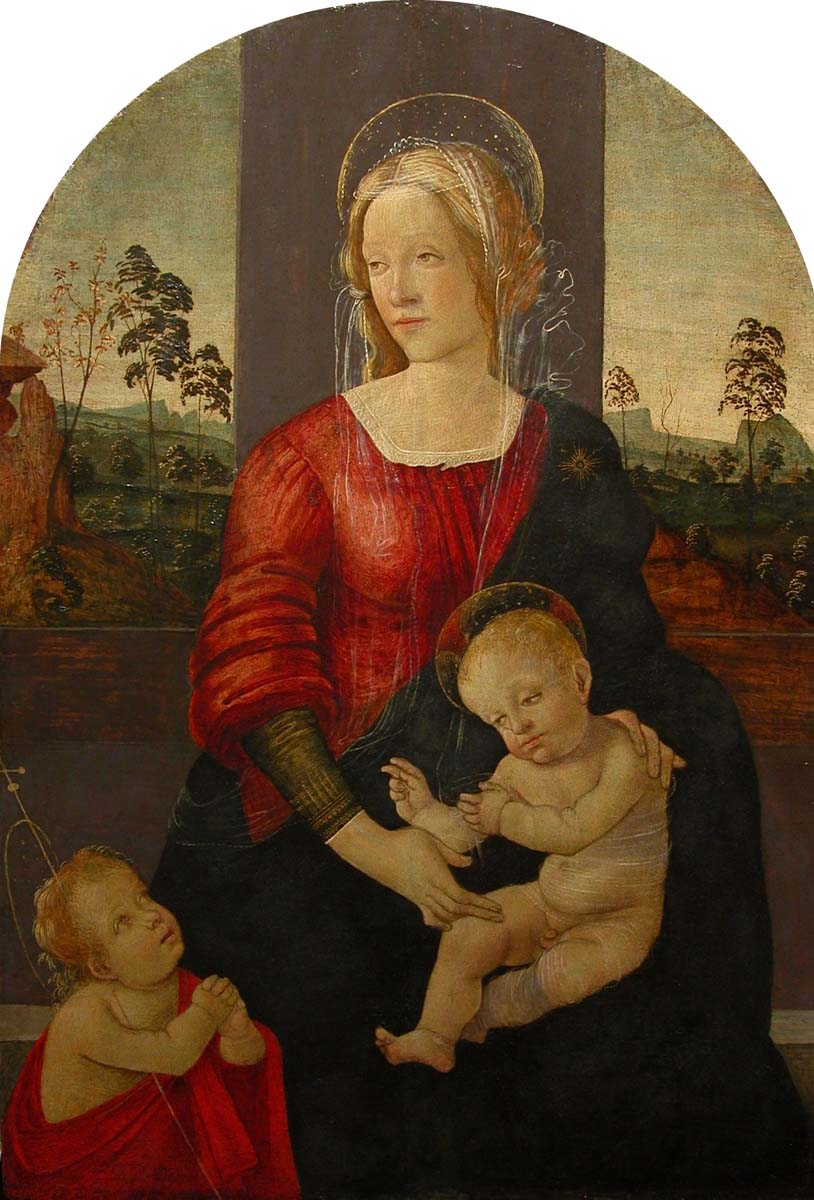
Sandro Botticelli (attribution) - Madonna and Child with St. John the Baptist, 15th century.

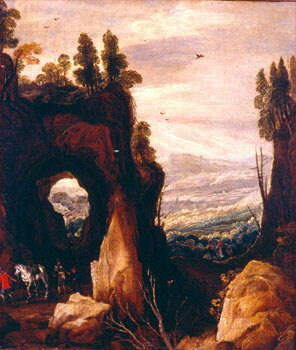
Joos de Momper - Rocky valley with figures, late 16th/early 17th century.

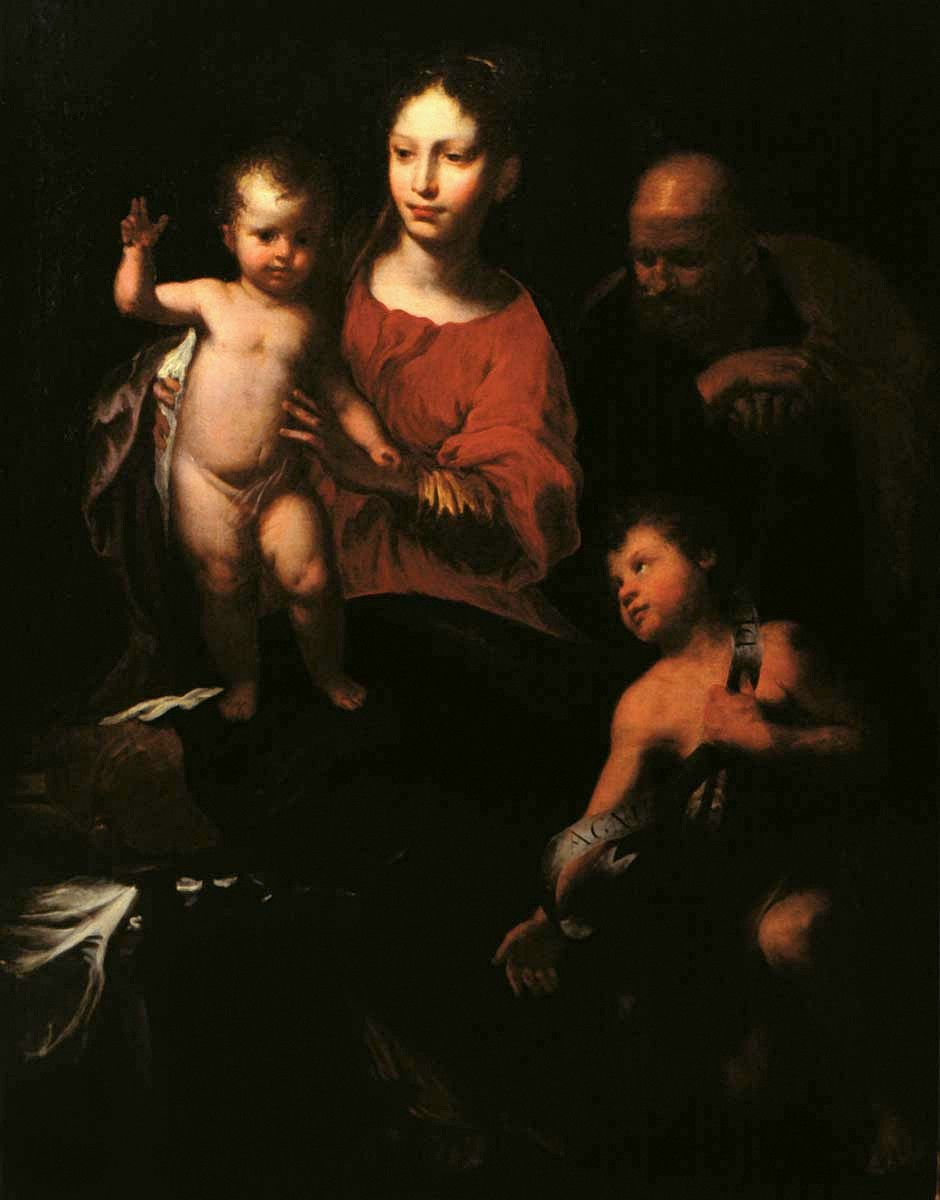
Bernardo Strozzi - Holy Family with St. John the Baptist, ca. 1600.

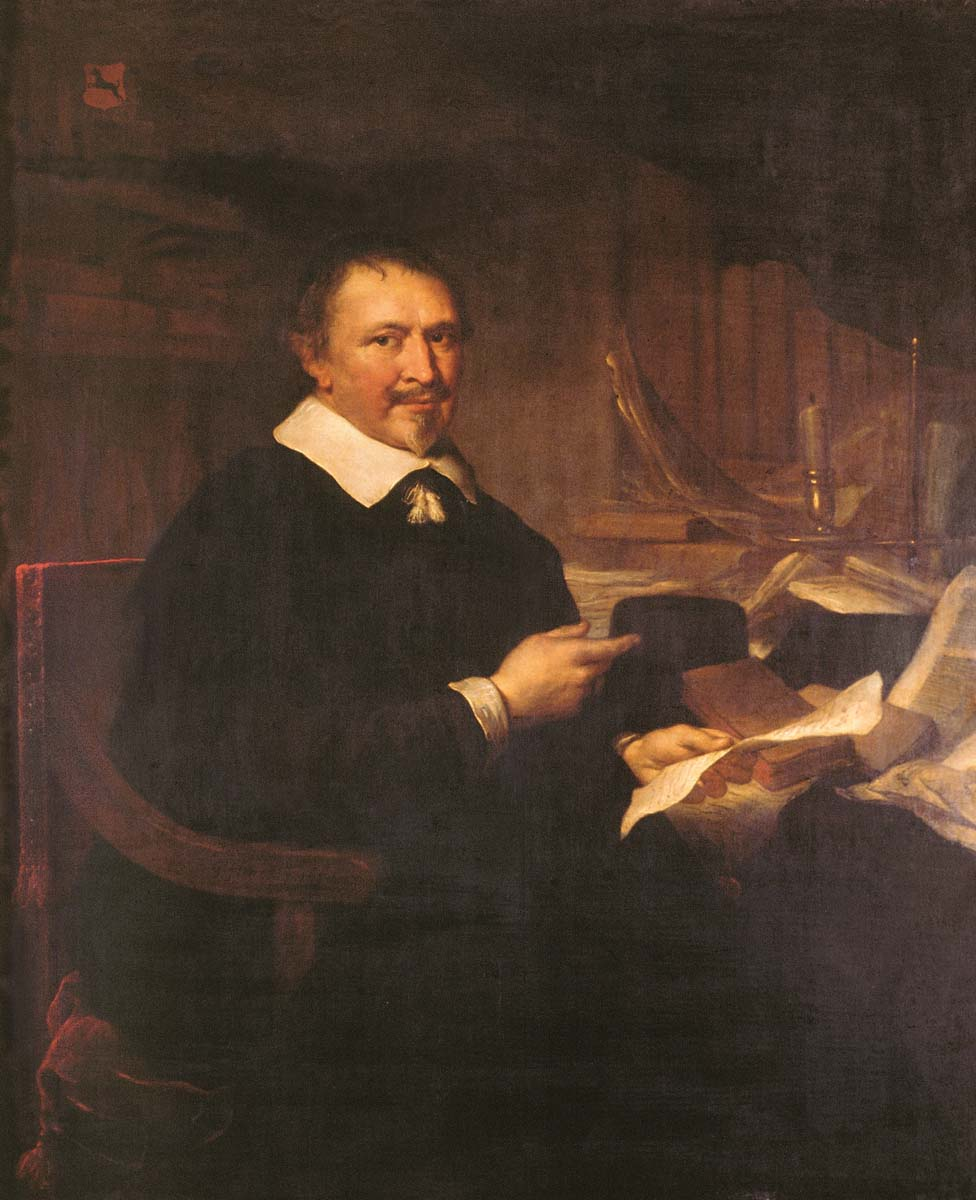
Govaert Flinck - Portrait of a man with books,1654.

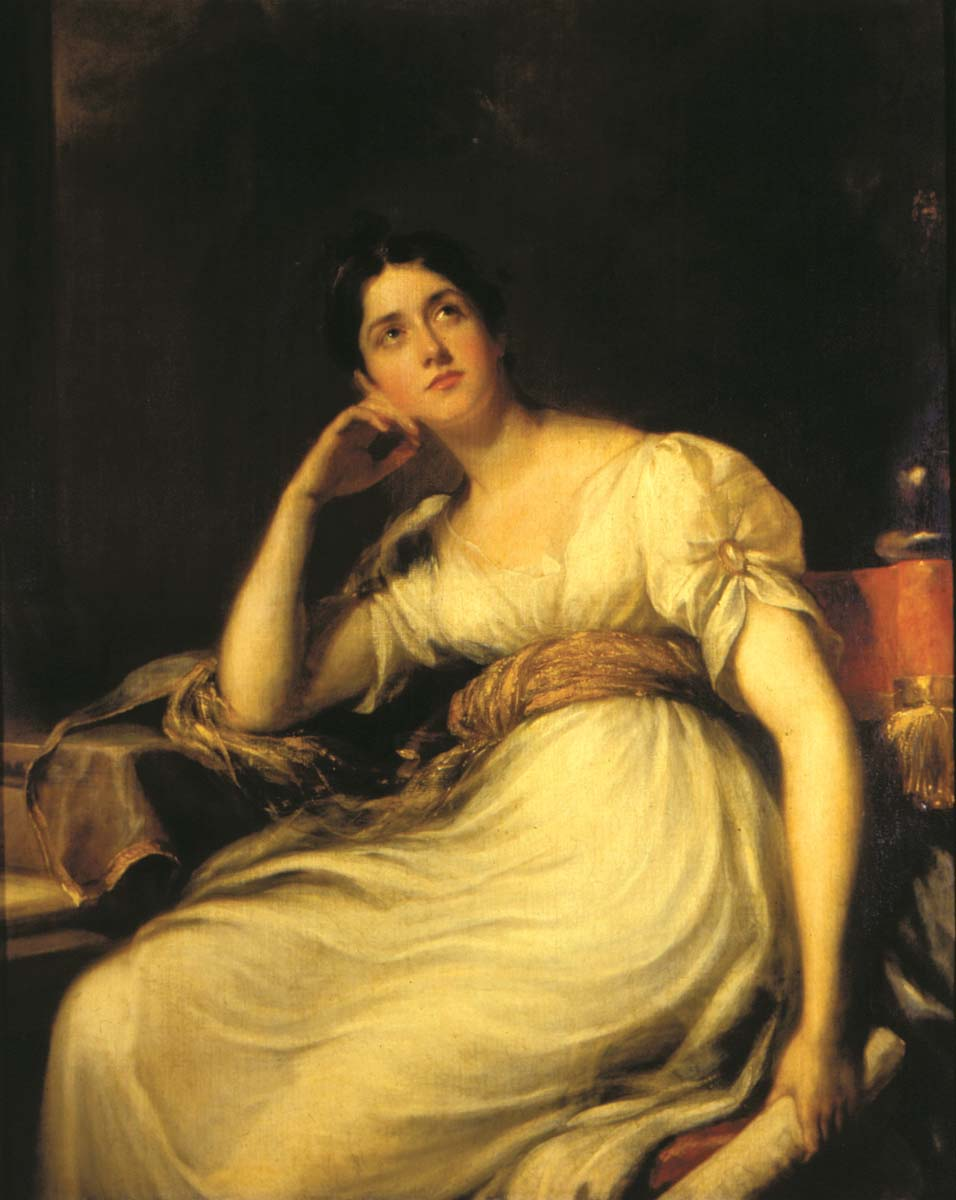
Thomas Lawrence - Portrait of Mrs. Williams, 18th century.

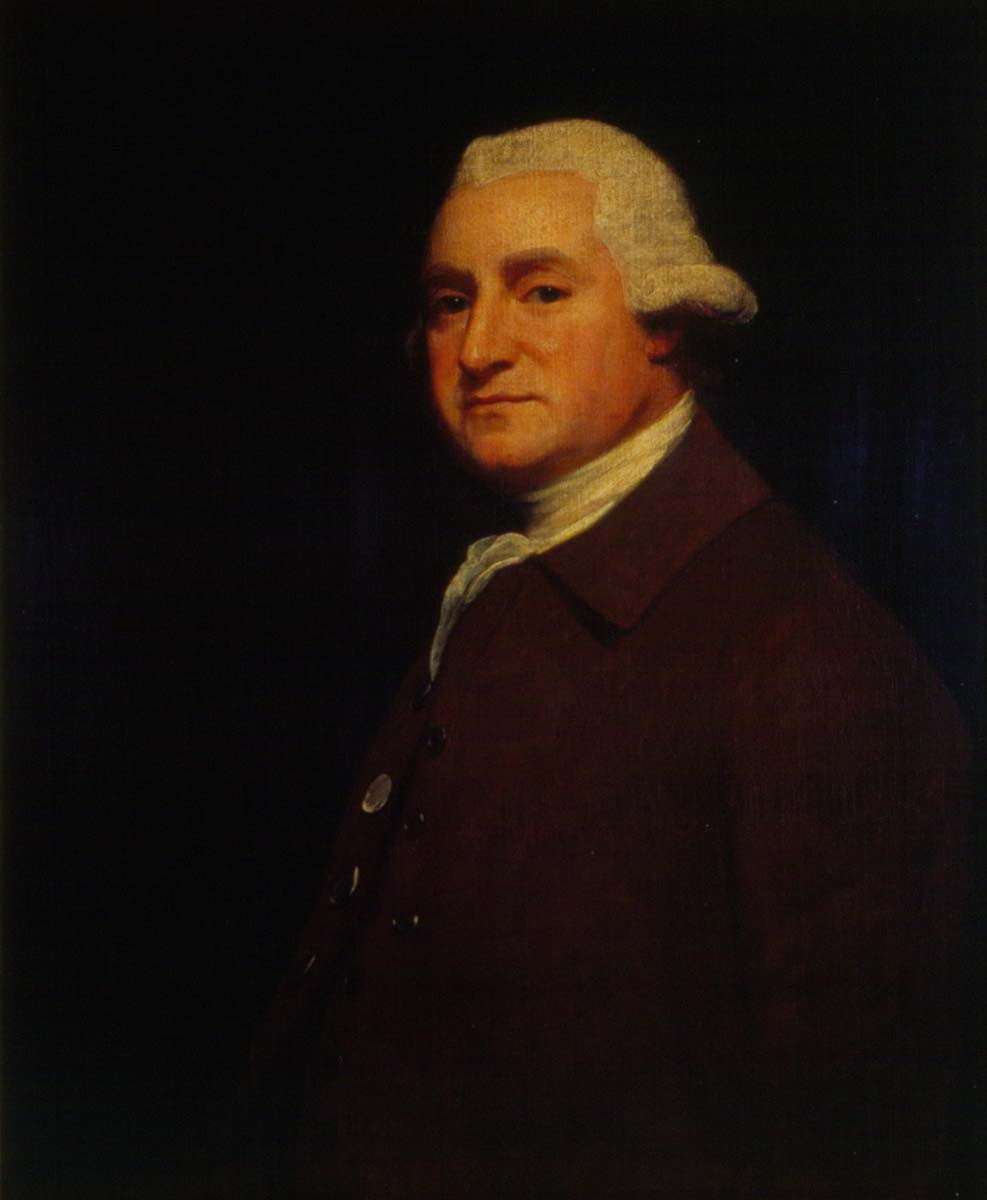
George Romney - Portrait of Mr. Critchley, 18th century.

== See also ==
- Ema Gordon Klabin Cultural Foundation
- Museu Nacional de Belas Artes
- São Paulo Museum of Art
