= Gabriel Briard =

French landscape and portrait painter

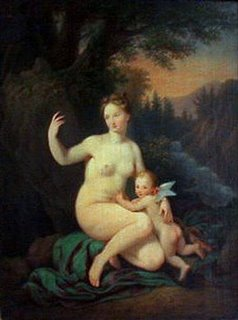
Venus and Cupido, now at the Ema Gordon Klabin Cultural Foundation in Brazil.

Gabriel Briard was a landscape and portrait painter of some grace and facility of hand, the master of Demarne, and just one of the influential painting teachers of Mme. Elisabeth Louise Vigée Le Brun. He visited Italy in 1749, became an Academician in 1768, and died in 1777.
